= European Union submarine internet cables =

Issues around EU cable infrastructure

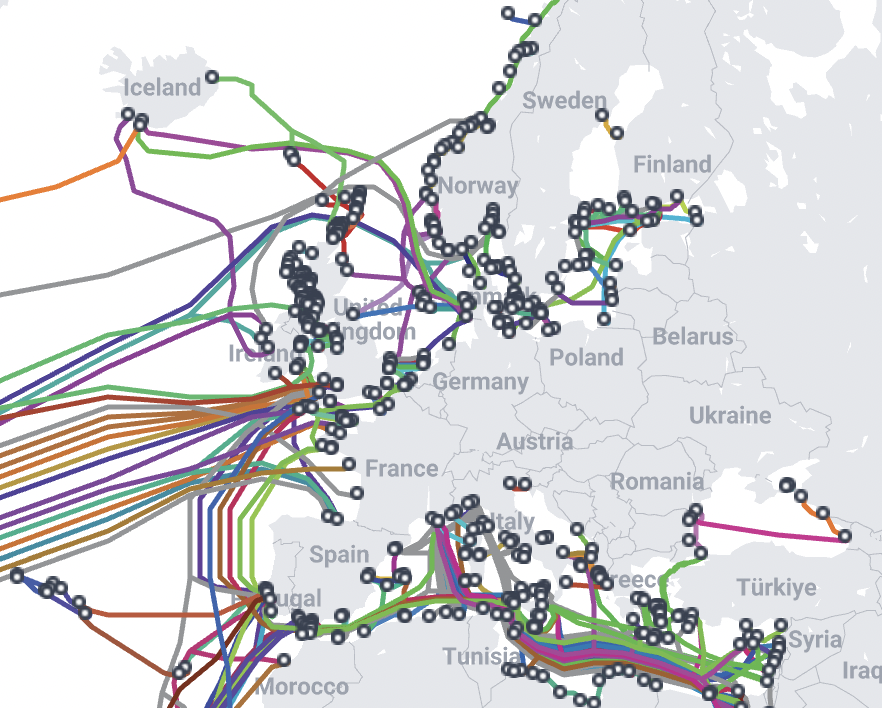
Europe's submarine cables network in May 2023

Submarine internet cables, also referred to as submarine communications cables or submarine fiber optic cables, are essential infrastructure that connect different locations and data centers to reliably exchange digital information at a high speeds.

They are significant providers of global internet connectivity: approximately 99% of international communications pass through submarine fiber optic cables, along with US$10 trillion in daily financial transactions. The European Union (EU), in particular, has a strong demand for connectivity, with 87% of EU citizens using the internet in 2021.

== Network description ==
=== External network ===
As of May 2023, the EU maintains direct connections via submarine cables to several regions:

- North America: 9 undersea cables (Dunant, MAREA, Apollo, Grace Hopper, FLAG Atlantic-1, AC-1, AEC-1, AEC-2, EXA Express, EXA North and South). One cable (Amitié) is being currently installed.
- South and East Asia: 8 undersea cables (PEACE, AAE-1, SeaMeWe-3, SeaMeWe-4, SeaMeWe-5, IMEWE, Europe India Gateway, FEA). Four cables are under installation (SeaMeWe-6, Africa-1, 2Africa, IEX).
- MENA region: 27 undersea cables. All cables going to Asia are also connected to the MENA region. Other cables are TE North, MedNautilus, Hawk, ORVAL, Estepona-Tetouan, Atlas Offshore, Canalink, EllaLink, Med Cable Network, KELTRA-2, Didon, HANNIBAL system, Italy-Libya, Silphium, UGARIT, Turcyos-1, Turcyos-2, CADMOS, KAFOS. 3 are being installed (Blue, Medusa submarine cable system, CADMOS-2).
- West, Eastern and South Africa: 5 undersea cables (SAT-3, MainOne, ACE, Equiano, PEACE). Two cables are under installation (2Africa, Africa-1).
- South America: 1 undersea cable (EllaLink).
- Oceania: 1 undersea cable (SeaMeWe-3).

The EU is also highly connected to the United Kingdom (UK), with 23 undersea cables linking the two. Although the EU lost a number of connections with North America following Brexit in 2016, it remains resilient due to strong collaboration and robust infrastructure independent of the UK.

=== Internal network ===
As of May 2023, the EU had 39 undersea cables connecting Member States exclusively. with three more under installation (Digital E4, Eastern Light Sweden-Finland II, Ionian). These cables mostly connect island states such as Malta or countries bordering the Baltic Sea.

- Northern Europe (31 cables): COBRAcable, GlobalConnect 2, Kattegat 2, Denmark-Sweden 16, Denmark-Sweden 17, Denmark-Sweden 18, Scandinavian Ring North, Scandinavian Ring South, Danica North, IP-Only Denmark-Sweden, Baltica, NordBalt, Latvia-Sweden 1, Sweden-Latvia, Baltic Sea Submarine cable, Eastern Light Sweden-Finland I, BCS North-Phase 1, Sweden-Finland 4, Sweden-Finland Link, Sweden-Estonia, C-Lion1, Finland-Estonia 2, Finland-Estonia 3, Finland-Estonia connection, Botnia, BCS East, BCS East-West Interlink, Denmark-Poland 2, Germany-Denmark 3, GlobalConnect-KPN, Fehmarn Bält.
- Southern Europe (8 cables): Malta-Italy Interconnector, Melita 1, Epic Malta-Sicily Cable System, Italy-Malta, GO-1 Mediterranean Cable System, Italy-Greece 1, OTEGlobe Kokkini-Bari, Italy-Croatia.

== Legal and Regulatory Framework ==
=== International law ===
The legal framework governing submarine internet cables is principally the United Nations Convention on the Law of the Sea (UNCLOS). Although research and development of the internet's physical infrastructure progressed during the 1970s, the internet and its underlying cable infrastructure came into widespread use only after UNCLOS was adopted in 1982.

Laying cables is part of the "freedom of the seas" (Article 87). Submarine cables are authorized everywhere except within territorial waters, where coastal states have sovereignty and may enforce their regulations. The laying, maintenance and repair of cables must consider existing infrastructure and respect the exclusive economic zones (EEZ) of coastal states (Article 79).

Ownership of submarine cables is primarily private, mostly by telecommunications companies. with increasing investments by technology firms such as Meta and Google. Most cables are owned and managed by consortia of companies. Under UNCLOS, owners are liable for damages to cables (Article 114). They must also compensate fishermen or ships for damage caused by cable protection measures (Article 115). States are obliged to criminalize intentional damage to submarine cables (Article 113), except when necessary to protect lives or ships.

With growing concerns climate change and environmental impacts, sustainable protection of submarine cables is a developing priority, though UNCLOS currently lacks mandatory enforcement mechanisms.

=== The European Union ===
Initially, regulation of cyberspace and internet infrastructure in the EU was left largely to private companies, reflecting an early philosophy of the internet as "free" space, influenced heavily by the United States. This approach shifted following cyberattacks on European governments (Estonia in 2007, Georgia in 2008), leading to increased state and EU involvement.

Given the importance of connectivity, especially with five Member States (France, Denmark, Italy, Portugal and Spain) as major contributors, the EU has recently recognized submarine internet cables as strategic and geopolitical assets. The Russo-Ukrainian War, and incidents such as the Nord Stream pipeline attack have further highlighted this importance.

However, submarine cable protection has not been a top priority; maritime security efforts focus more on piracy, people smuggling, and environmental issues. Fisheries, significant in certain EU countries, are linked to cable protection but have often viewed it as a lesser concern.

Responsibility for cable protection generally resides with national governments. According to the 2023 report by the European Union Agency for Cybersecurity (ENISA), regulatory regimes vary:

- France: The Secretariat-General for National Defence and Security, the Secretariat-General of the Sea, and the French Navy oversee cable protection with companies like Orange Marine conducting maintenance.
- Portugal: Multiple agencies, coordinated by the National Communications Authority (ANACOM), manage cable permits and monitoring, including alert systems for ships near cable routes.
- Other countries (e.g.,Bulgaria, Sweden): Private cable owners assume responsibility for security.

Internet cables were not classified as Critical Infrastructure in the 2008 European Programme for Critical Infrastructure Protection(EPCIP), but the 2013 update recognized cyberspace as a growing concern. Today, submarine cables are categorized under "information and communication systems" critical infrastructure by the EU.

== Threats ==
Submarine internet cables are subject to threats and damages of different kinds, to which the EU is more or less vulnerable. Three categories can be distinguished: natural causes, unintentional human causes and intentional human causes.

=== Natural threats ===
The first kind of damages to internet cables are natural hazards. Overall, they account for less than 10% of all submarine internet cables damages. Natural hazards comprise:

- Shark/fish bites. There is no consensus as to why sharks bite undersea cables. Hypotheses are curiosity, or confusion with food due to the cables’ electric field (similar to electromagnetic fields sensed from their preys). They remain a marginal threat: fish bite accounts for only 0.5% of cable faults over the period 1959–2006. They are mainly a concern for consortiums and not for the EU, as traffic can easily go through another path. Google declared in 2014 that they would wrap at least a part of their submarine internet cables, made of fibre, in Kevlar-like material to protect them. This kind of measures, as well as cable burials in the seabed, made that no damaging fish bites were reported over 2007–2014.
- Abrasion. Abrasion mainly happens when there are wave activities, currents, or when cables are laid on rock. It is a more predictable phenomenon, which is why scientists try to identify its conditions and develop protections. It was responsible for 3.7% of cables faults over 1959–2006.
- Natural disasters (volcano eruptions, earthquakes, tsunamis). They mostly happen in geologically unstable areas, which are outside the EU – even though there is a seismic risk in the Balkans, Greece, and Italy. The danger of such events is to break several cables at the same time, making it harder or impossible to circumvent data through another path. Natural disasters especially represent a major threat to island states, because they are geographically more exposed and because they are often poorly connected. Recent examples of massive internet interruptions are Typhoon Morakot (2009) or the 2022 Tonga volcano eruption.

Climate change could constitute a new threat to undersea cables. It is characterised by its uncertainty – scenarios are only assumptions –, and its uneven consequences across the world. First, climate change creates more frequent and more intense storms and hurricanes. These, as well as changes in precipitations, could make the seabed more unstable, which would influence currents and sediments movements. Cables would then be more vulnerable to erosion. However, buried cables would be less or not impacted, if they are buried deep. Second, global warming increases seismic activities, so the EU and its network could become more vulnerable to earthquakes and tsunamis. Last, cable landing stations are also threatened by climate change. Rising sea level will expose them (as well as a part of onshore cables) to floods, while hurricanes could increase power outages. Northwest Europe is among the most exposed landing location to storm surges. However, the EU coastline is one of the least exposed to sea level rise, with sea level at landing stations even projected to lower by 2052.

=== Involuntary human threats ===
The biggest cause of submarine internet cables damage is fishing, which accounts for 44.6% of cable faults over 1959–2006. The EU represents 3% of the fisheries and aquaculture production of the world and ranks as its fifth largest one. The most widely used method of fishing, which is also the most damaging to submarine cables, is bottom trawling. It is extremely intense in the English Channel, the Strait of Dover, and the Skagerrak. When the fishing gear is on the sea bottom, it can move the cable or get stuck underneath, eventually breaking it or damaging the waterproof protection and causing court-circuits. This situation is also prejudicial to the fishermen, as such a collision often means loss of fish, time, and damage on their fishing gear. Another damage caused by ships is anchoring, which was responsible for 14.6% of cable damages over 1959–2006. This happens when ships drop anchor right on a cable. Overall, these damages happen in areas where the EU has a really high linkage, so data can easily be circumvented through another route.

=== Voluntary human threats ===
Undersea cables are also vulnerable to targeted attacks conducted by humans. Three categories can be distinguished: blue crime, terrorism, and state-sponsored attacks.

==== Blue crime ====
Blue crime refers to “serious organised crimes or offences that take place transnationally, on, in or across the maritime domain and cause or have the potential to inflict significant harm”. It is close to the notion of transnational organised crimes at sea. The only aim of blue crime is monetary profit. One form of criminal activity against submarine cables is cable theft. An example is the cable between Singapore and Indonesia, which was partly robbed in 2013: 31,7 km and 418 tons of cables were removed. Another scenario is a criminal group threatening to harm cables if no ransom is received. Last, cables could be damaged to cover an unrelated criminal attack, as it would diminish surveillance capacities.

==== Terrorism ====
Terrorism is close to blue crime, except that its aim is political and not monetary. For now, no terrorist attack against submarine cables have been recorded. Attacks could consist in targeting landing stations, or dragging an anchor on the seabed in an area of high cable density. However, the probability of a blackout in the EU or in one of its Member States is low, as it would require precision and coordination. Besides, terrorists themselves rely on internet cables to communicate, and to spread terror to the public, so it is not in their interest to damage the whole network. Risks are higher for remote islands with less connectivity, such as EU Member States’ naval bases abroad (like in Djibouti), EU Islands, or Member States’ oversea territories (like La Réunion, which possesses 3 submarine cables).

==== State-led attacks ====
To date, no attack on submarine internet cables has been attributed to a State. However, the attack of the gas pipeline Nord Stream II in 2022, presumably United States-sponsored, underlines that this kind of sabotage is possible. Overall, the shadow of these attacks is part of hybrid threats. The EU defines them as: “when actors seek to exploit the vulnerabilities of the EU to their own advantage by using a mixture of measures (i.e. diplomatic, military, economic, technological) while remaining below the threshold of formal warfare". The greatest fear is hence that submarine internet cables vandalism might be used as part of a coordinate attack targeting other key infrastructures, like cyberspace. Despite Sweden and Denmark's lack of finding a culprit, Russia is often thought to have been involved in the Nords Stream sabotage due to the tensions with the EU and the presence of Russian ships around it days prior. Russia has previously been associated with strategies such as the spread of fake news, the sponsor of cyberattacks, and navigation close to key EU infrastructures. For example, in February 2022, Russia did a military exercise at the border of Ireland's EEZ, near undersea internet cables. An Irish officer notes "the intention is not to cut the cables but to send a message [to NATO] that they can cut them anytime they want". However, the principle of hybrid threats is that attacks, when they happen, are non-attributable.

Another concern is China's ubiquity in the submarine internet cables network. 100 out of 400 global internet cables are managed or have been built by HMN Technologies, which also possesses 10% of market shares. This gives China power over the current and upcoming infrastructure, but also gives it a potential for data interception.

== Protection ==
=== Physical ===
The EU lets the cables and fishery industries regulate themselves. It is about "talking to each other to raise awareness" or "changing the design of fishing gear". However, the EU facilitates dialogue through its European Maritime Spatial Planning (MSP) platform. It is also thinking about pushing for cable routes/corridors, or developing no-anchor/no-trawl zones. It could also require cables to cross shipping lanes by the shortest route possible, and/or to be buried.

EU protection measures especially target intentional damage, particularly state-sponsored hybrid threats. There is however no piece of legislation from the EU that only deals with submarine internet cables.

Cables are the competency of Member States. However, monitoring cables is very challenging and requires significant resources. States therefore seek for a "Union-wide coordinated approach to strengthen the resilience of critical infrastructure". The EU complements their action, by upgrading risk assessments and responses.

The EU has a European Programme for Critical Infrastructure Protection (EPCIP), which was last updated in 2013. Additional measures for Critical Infrastructure protection were on the EU Commission’s agenda in 2020. Today, the EPCIP is complemented by other legal frameworks. Submarine internet cables protection is dealt with in the European Union Maritime Security Strategy (EUMSS). The 2018 EUMSS already sought to enhance the critical infrastructures’ resilience, via risk assessment and management, and education and training. The 2023 update implements common military exercises among voluntary Member States, to better address hybrid threats, both at sea and on land. The goal is to improve "both the physical and cyber resilience of critical entities and infrastructures". The link between undersea cables and cyberspace is now more widely recognized. Internet cables are also mentioned in the NIS 2 directive, which deals with EU cybersecurity. It expects each State to issue a national cybersecurity strategy (which includes cable protection), and report issues to the European level. In addition, by January 17, 2026, Member States should have drawn a list of critical entities for each recognized sector, and build up a national strategy for critical infrastructure protection.

The EU also wants to enhance cooperation with its allies, particularly the US and NATO, in terms of information exchange and surveillance. The European Centre of Excellence for Countering Hybrid Threats is one of their knowledge-building collaboration measures, in the area of hybrid threats. An EU-NATO Task Force was also created in March 2023 to work on critical infrastructure resilience (energy, transports, digital infrastructure, and space). However, “technological sovereignty” is one of EU Commission President Ursula von der Leyen’s top priorities for her mandate (2019–2024). The EU will aim at being ore independent from its allies such as the USA. The 2013 leak of pieces of US intelligence revealed that the USA were spying on their allies, while at that time 80–85% of data traffic between the EU and Latin America was going through North America. Brazil and the EU created EllaLink because of this event.

=== Human Rights ===
Recently, debates have risen regarding access to communication. Arguments state that the world has become too connected and dependent on internet to avoid needing it. Internet is important for emergency issues, to be able to communicate if something happens. It is compared to other rights under the United Nations Declaration of Human Rights such as freedom of speech and, most importantly, the right to health and to communicate emergencies. Protection of cables are, then, not just a duty to protect access to internet but one to protect Human Rights. With 8% of the population with no access to internet in 2021, the rapid development of internet is an act to protect those rights.

== See also ==
- List of international submarine communications cables
- Submarine communications cables – Transoceanic communication line placed on the seabed
