= CISE =

CISE may refer to:

- Channel Islands Stock Exchange, a stock exchange operating 1998-2013.
- Channel Islands Securities Exchange, the initial name of The International Stock Exchange (TISE), a stock exchange based in Guernsey;
- Common Information Sharing Environment, a maritime surveillance policy of the European Union Maritime Security Strategy (EUMSS).
