= Dunant =

Dunant may refer to:

- Henry Dunant (1828–1910), Swiss businessman, social activist and humanitarian
- Olivier Dunant, Swiss treasurer
- Dunant, a submarine communications cable connecting the US and France
