= Havfrue =

Submarine communications cable

Havfrue/AEConnect 2
- Owners: Aqua Comms, Meta, Google, Bulk Infrastructure
- Landing points: 1. New Jersey, United States; 2. Blaabjerg, Denmark; 3. Leckanvy, Republic of Ireland; 4. Kristiansand, Norway
- Total length: 7851 km
- Design capacity: 108Tbps
- Technology: Fiber optics

Havfrue (Mermaid) is a submarine communications cable privately owned by Aqua Comms, Meta, Google and Bulk Infrastructure, linking the United States, Ireland and Denmark.

== History ==
Havfrue comprises a main trunk beginning in New Jersey, USA (NJFX) and landing in Blaabjerg, Denmark, which comprises six fiber pairs. Two further branches connect Ireland (Old Head Beach, Leckanvy), with six fiber pairs and Norway (Kristiansand) with two fiber pairs.

The cable was laid by TE SubCom and has a designed capacity of 108 Tbit/s. The operator and landing party in the US, Ireland and Denmark is Aqua Comms, which will market and sell capacity services and raw spectrum under the brand name 'America Europe Connect-2' (AEC-2).

Bulk Fibre Networks is utilising Ciena’s Spectrum Sharing submarine network infrastructure to provide tailored virtual fiber pairs on its part of the infrastructure, as well as Ciena's GeoMesh Extreme submarine network solution and Manage, Control and Plan (MCP) domain controller, which provides network management capabilities.

The Havfrue/AEC-2 cable system was ready for service by 1 December 2020.

In 2023, EXA Infrastructure added Havfrue to its transatlantic subsea cable route network connecting USA and Europe.

== Ownership ==
- Meta owns two fiber pairs on the Main Trunk and two fiber pairs on the Ireland branch.
- Aqua Comms owns two fiber pairs on the Main Trunk and four fiber pairs on the Ireland branch.
- Google owns one fiber pair on the Main Branch.
- Bulk Infrastructure owns one fiber pair on the Main Trunk and both fiber pairs on the Norway Branch.
