= Amitié (submarine communications cable) =

Transatlantic communications cable connecting the US to UK and France

- Owners: Edge Cable Holdings (Facebook), AquaComms, Cable & Wireless Americas Systems (Vodafone), Microsoft and Orange
- Landing points Lynn (MA), Le Porge France: 1. United Kingdom Bude, Cornwall (50°50′7.8″N 4°33′9″W); 2. France Le Porge; 3. United States Lynn, Massachusetts
- Total length: 6,800 km
- Design capacity: 320 Tbit/s
- Technology: Fibre optic
- Date of first use: trial 2023

Amitié is a private transatlantic communications cable that connects the United States (Lynn), with the UK (Bude) and France (Le Porge). It was announced in 2020 and went live in October 2023. In 2023, EXA Infrastructure added Amitié to its transatlantic subsea cable route network connecting USA and Europe.

== History ==
Edge Cable Holdings (Facebook), Aqua Comms, Cable & Wireless Americas Systems (Vodafone) and Microsoft Infrastructure applied for a license to land and operate a 6,800-kilometre optical submarine cable from the US in August 2020. The application stated the proposed private cable – Amitié – would be operated on a non-common-carrier basis.

The proposed route for the new cable was from a landing site in Lynn, MA, US to a new landing station in the Bordeaux region of France (Le Porge) and the Bude landing station in the UK

In January 2021, Orange announced it had become part of this consortium and would act as the landing party for the Le Porge site. The partnership deal gives Orange ownership of the portion of the Amitié cable system that stretches from 12 nautical miles off the French shore to the French landing site. It also has two fibre pairs on the system on an IRU basis.

Facebook's subsidiary – Edge USA – owns 80% of the cable and is the landing party for the US landing site at Lynn, contracting with the site's owner GTT. Vodafone is the landing party for the UK landing site at Bude through its subsidiary Apollo Submarine Cable System.

In September 2021, Orange announced it had landed the cable in Le Porge. The cable went live in October 2023.

== Specifications ==
The Amitié cable has 16 fibre pairs, each with 23 Tbit/s capacity. The new cable is expected to support the development of the Bordeaux area in France into a new international digital hub, encouraging more data centres to be built. In 2021, Equinix unveiled a new carrier neutral data centre, BX1, in Bordeaux which serves as the connectivity hub for the new cable.

Amitié was laid by Alcatel Submarine Networks (ASN) (a subsidiary of Nokia) at an estimated cost of 250 million euros.

== See also ==
- Dark fibre
- Submarine communications cable
- Transatlantic communications cable
