= EXA Express =

Submarine communications cable system

- Owners: EXA Infrastructure
- Landing points: 1. Halifax County, Nova Scotia, Canada; 2. (United Kingdom) Brean, Somerset, UK; 3. (Republic of Ireland) County Cork, Ireland
- Total length: Ca.4,600km
- Design capacity: 53 Tbps
- Technology: Fibre optics

EXA Express (formerly Hibernia Express) is a submarine communications cable system linking Canada, Ireland, and the United Kingdom. EXA Express is now owned by telecommunications provider EXA Infrastructure after their 2021 acquisition of the infrastructure assets of GTT Communications. With a latency of 58.95ms, the cable currently provides the lowest latency fibre optic route between the NY4 data centre in Secaucus, New Jersey and London.

The cable was considered operational on September 15, 2015. EXA Express spans 4,600 km between its landing stations in Halifax County, Nova Scotia, Canada; Brean, Somerset, UK; and County Cork, Ireland. The cable is constructed with six fibre pairs, with a design capacity for 53 Tbit/s.

During the planning phases of the cable, Hibernia Networks intended to use Huawei as the contractor for construction. However, due to security concerns from the potential customers, Huawei was not used and the construction contract went to TE Subcom (owned by TE Connectivity).
