= Global Capacity =

- Type: Private
- Founded: Houston, Texas, United States (2000)
- Headquarters: 265 Winter Street; Waltham, Massachusetts
- Key people: Jack Lodge; President
- Products: Connectivity as a Service, Access network services, Carrier Ethernet, MPLS VPN, One Marketplace, LATTIS telecommunications pricing and supply information
- Website: http://www.globalcapacity.com

Global Capacity is a Waltham, Massachusetts-based provider of telecommunications Connectivity-as-a-Service including Carrier Ethernet, used by companies for Internet access and WAN connectivity. Network services are offered using the company's One Marketplace hub, which aggregates the access and pricing information for broadband telecommunications services, including MPLS VPN, Ethernet over copper and Digital Subscriber Line (DSL). The company buys and combines multiple high-speed network connections and then resells multiple lower-speed connections to customers. The company also manages and updates LATTIS, a proprietary database of telecom pricing information.

On June 26, 2017 GTT Communications announced it was acquiring Global Capacity for $100 million and 1.85 million shares of GTT common stock.

== History ==
Global Capacity, originally known as Global Capacity Group, was founded in Houston, Texas in 2000, as a wholesale broadband trading company. The two founders, John Abraham and David Walsh, had worked together at Enron's broadband unit and realized the potential demand for a broadband market trading company. The company began creating individualized communications networks that didn't rely on any one network, allowing the company to offer the best connections at the cheapest price.

By 2006, the company had expanded its services from broadband delivery to network operations management and consulting services, creating and building secure, private data and voice networks for other businesses.

In December 2006, the company was sold to Capital Growth Systems (CGS), and was combined with two other companies, Centrepath, a provider of network management services, and 20/20 Technologies, a provider of telecommunications quoting and configuration software. 20/20 Technologies, which had been bought by CGS, had earlier acquired software vendor Magenta NetLogic in 2004. The combined company continued to do business as Global Capacity.

In November 2008, Global Capacity paid $15M to acquire Vanco Direct USA, a network service provider of consulting services for global corporate networks, and the owner of LATTIS (Local Area Transport Tariff Information System), an information tool for circuit pricing.

In 2009, Global Capacity announced their organization into two groups: Optimization Solutions and Connectivity Solutions. Optimization Solutions were targeted to improving network efficiency for clients and offered network pricing, monitoring and engineering services. Connectivity solutions were targeted at simplifying the network connectivity procurement process for customers. Also in 2009, Global Capacity launched One Marketplace, a network connectivity trading platform that combines network capacity from multiple suppliers and uses telecommunications switching equipment to deploy this capacity toward market demand.

In 2010, Global Capacity filed for Chapter 11 bankruptcy protection.

In May 2011, Capital Growth Systems, Inc. (CGS) sold Global Capacity to Pivotal Global Capacity Pivotal (GC Pivotal), an affiliate company of Pivotal Group, a Phoenix-based national investment company. Later that month, the company announced the release of LATTIS Global, an extension of its LATTIS tariff quoting system, to 35 additional countries.

In 2013, Global Capacity announced it was expanding its Points of Presence (PoPs) into eight Equinix data centers in North America, allowing it to connect to Equinix's Ethernet Exchange.

In March 2014, the company announced the expansion of its services into the UK, citing the large number of US multi-national companies with offices in the UK.

In July 2014, the company signed a master service agreement with the National Cable Television Cooperative (NCTC), allowing NCTC's 950+ independent and rural members to use One Marketplace to automatically expand their North American network service coverage outside their network service areas.

In September 2014, Global Capacity announced its plan to buy MegaPath's wholesale and direct access business. The assets included those acquired from DSL-provider Covad, which in 2010 had merged with MegaPath and Speakeasy to form the new MegaPath. The acquisition was completed in January 2015.

In April 2015, the company announced the availability of MPLS VPN services over the One Marketplace platform, as a result of the network assets acquired from MegaPath.

In May 2015, the company announced the addition of Google Cloud to its service portfolio.

On June 26, 2017 GTT Communications announced it was acquiring Global Capacity for $100 million and 1.85 million shares of GTT common stock. The deal, anticipated to close in the third quarter of 2017, was expected to help GTT expand its SD-WAN and data center services. On September 2, 2021, GTT announced that the company and certain U.S.-based subsidiaries planned to file for Chapter 11 bankruptcy in the U.S. Bankruptcy Court for the Southern District of New York as part of a Pre-packaged insolvency agreement, following the completion of the sale of its infrastructure division. The company said it expected to continue operating without interruption, with the support of its lenders.

== Products and services ==
=== One Marketplace ===
Global Capacity is a network service provider focusing on the delivery of Connectivity-as-a-Service (CaaS). The company purchases high-bandwidth connections from network operators and resells lower-speed connections to other network operators, through an interconnected network platform called One Marketplace. One Marketplace allows network operators to obtain quotes on wholesale services, and it automates their purchases. Customers access One Marketplace using an application called Circuit Lifecycle Manager (CLM). The company offers an Application Programming Interface (API) for CLM, to allow third developers to create complementary applications for accessing One Marketplace.

One of the applications the company developed for One Marketplace is Network Builder, used for designing wide-area networks with a modeling approach allowing customers to examine different scenarios when designing their networks.

Using the Covad legacy access infrastructure purchased from MegaPath, the company also sells its own Ethernet over copper and DSL connections to customers. With Global Capacity's equipment located inside the phone companies' central offices (COs), One Marketplace calculates whether a customer can get Ethernet over copper service or DSL service at a specific address by measuring the distance from the customer site to the serving CO. As of January 2015, the One Marketplace platform included access to 41 points of presence (PoPs), 2,007 COs and over 4,500 last-mile network interconnections for customer service delivery.

=== LATTIS tariff pricing database ===
The company owns and updates the LATTIS tariff pricing database, which provides access to a database of published local area tariff rates for multiple carriers and geographies. The database includes 325 tariffs with large service providers, including tariff rates for E-LINE and E-LAN services offered by ILECs and operators including AT&T, Verizon, CenturyLink, FairPoint Communications, among others. The database is also targeted towards international carriers trying to understand telecommunications pricing in the US market. LATTIS stands for Local Area Transport Tariff Information System. Global Capacity acquired LATTIS from Vanco Direct in 2008.

=== Network management services ===
The company also offers a range of network management services related to the development, enhancement and monitoring of broadband networks.

== Awards and recognition ==
In 2015, the company was awarded the Pipeline Innovation Award by communication industry publication Pipeline, for the One Marketplace solution and Network Builder application.

In 2015 and 2014, the company was awarded the Communications Solutions Product of the Year by global media company TMC for the One Marketplace solution and Network Builder application.

In 2014, One Marketplace was awarded the Best Service Innovation award for its One Marketplace solution, by Capacity Magazine, a publication of Capacity Media, a company focused on the wholesale telecommunications industry.

In 2012, One Marketplace was named Best Technology Partner by Capacity Magazine.

In 2011, the company received Internet Telephony Magazine's TEM award for their ability to help telecommunications expense management.
