= Find Me =

Find Me may refer to:

== Literature ==
- Find Me (novel), by André Aciman, 2019
- Find Me, a 2002 memoir by Rosie O'Donnell
- Find Me, a 2015 novel by Laura van den Berg
- Find Me, a 2017 novel by Jon Stock

== Music ==
=== Albums ===
- Find Me (Happy Rhodes album), 2007
- Find Me (EP), 2011

=== Songs ===
- "Find Me" (Marshmello song), 2016
- "Find Me" (Sigma song), featuring Birdy, 2016
- "Find Me", by Alison Moyet from the 1991 album Hoodoo
- "Find Me", by Allday from the 2014 album Startup Cult
- "Find Me", by Alma from the 2020 album Have U Seen Her?
- "Find Me", by David Gates from the 2002 album The David Gates Songbook
- "Find Me", by Kings of Leon from the 2016 album Walls
- "Find Me", by Laura Branigan from the 1983 album Branigan 2
- "Find Me", by Muroki, 2022
- "Find Me", by Robin Schulz from the 2015 album Sugar
- "Find Me", by Tinie Tempah from the 2017 album Youth

== Other uses ==
- "Find Me" (The Walking Dead), 2021 episode of the series
- Find Me, a 2018 film featuring Kirby Howell-Baptiste
- Find Me, a 2017–18 television series, app, and game produced by BlackBoxTV
- MapQuest Find Me, a MapQuest locator service for GPS-enabled mobile phones

== See also ==
- Find me/follow me, two services for routing incoming phone calls
