= Brean =

Village and civil parish in Somerset, England

Coordinates: 51.300°N 3.011°W

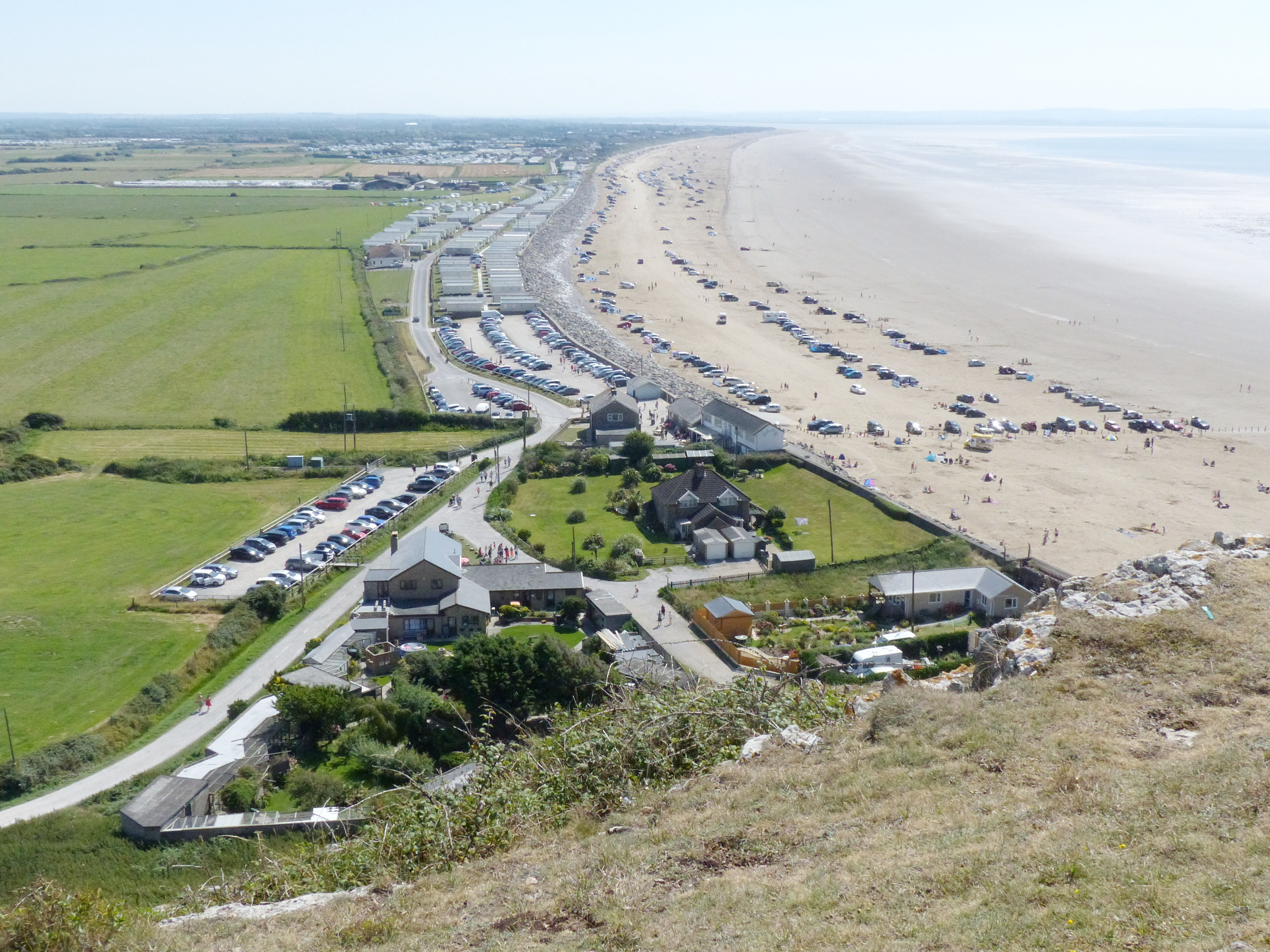
- Brean Sands and village from Brean Down

- Location within Somerset
- Population: 635 (2011)
- OS grid reference: ST296560
- Unitary authority: Somerset Council
- Ceremonial county: Somerset
- Region: South West
- Country: England
- Sovereign state: United Kingdom
- Post town: BURNHAM-ON-SEA
- Postcode district: TA8
- Dialling code: 01278
- Police: Avon and Somerset
- Fire: Devon and Somerset
- Ambulance: South Western
- UK Parliament: Bridgwater

Brean is a village and civil parish between Weston-super-Mare and Burnham-on-Sea in Somerset, England. The name is derived from "Bryn"; Brythonic and Modern Welsh for a hill. It has a population of 635.

Close to the village is Brean Down, a promontory standing 320 feet (98 m) high and extending 1.5 miles (2.4 km) into the Bristol Channel, on which stands Brean Down Fort, marking the end of Weston Bay.

The village is on a strip of land between the sea and the River Axe. It is the home of Brean Leisure Park, a tropical bird garden, other tourist attractions, and several caravan parks. The sandy beach has been used for land sailing since 1970. Sometimes, Brean can also be linked with the nearby village, Berrow so the villages can also be called Berrow & Brean.

== History ==
Brean was part of the hundred of Bempstone. During the Bristol Channel floods of 1607, the village was flooded, with seven of its nine houses being destroyed and 26 inhabitants drowned.

== Telecommunications ==
Brean's long, flat beach and location on the west coast of England have meant it has been used as landing point for transatlantic submarine cables

Windmill House, on South Road, was one of the terminuses for the PTAT-1 cable from Manasquan, New Jersey, United States. It was constructed in 1989 by Mercury Communications and closed in 2004.

Brean Sands is the landing point for the EXA Express transatlantic cable, which began operation in 2015, and EXA Infrastructure operates a landing station in the village.

== Governance ==
The parish council has responsibility for local issues, including setting an annual precept (local rate) to cover the council's operating costs and producing annual accounts for public scrutiny. The parish council evaluates local planning applications and works with the local police, district council officers, and neighbourhood watch groups on matters of crime, security, and traffic. The parish council's role also includes initiating projects for the maintenance and repair of parish facilities, as well as consulting with the district council on the maintenance, repair, and improvement of highways, drainage, footpaths, public transport, and street cleaning. Conservation matters (including trees and listed buildings) and environmental issues are also the responsibility of the council.

For local government purposes, since 1 April 2023, the village comes under the unitary authority of Somerset Council. Prior to this, it was part of the non-metropolitan district of Sedgemoor, which was formed on 1 April 1974 under the Local Government Act 1972, having previously been part of Axbridge Rural District.

It is also part of the Bridgwater constituency represented in the House of Commons of the Parliament of the United Kingdom. It elects one Member of Parliament (MP) by the first past the post system of election, and was part of the South West England constituency of the European Parliament prior to Britain leaving the European Union in January 2020, which elected seven MEPs using the d'Hondt method of party-list proportional representation.

== Religious sites ==
The Church of St Bridget dates from the 13th century, but the fabric is predominantly from the 15th century and was extensively rebuilt around 1882. It is designated by English Heritage as a Grade II* listed building. The dedication to St Bridget of Ireland, Abbess of Kildare, who died in 525, is an indication of a Celtic Christian settlement.

== Gallery ==
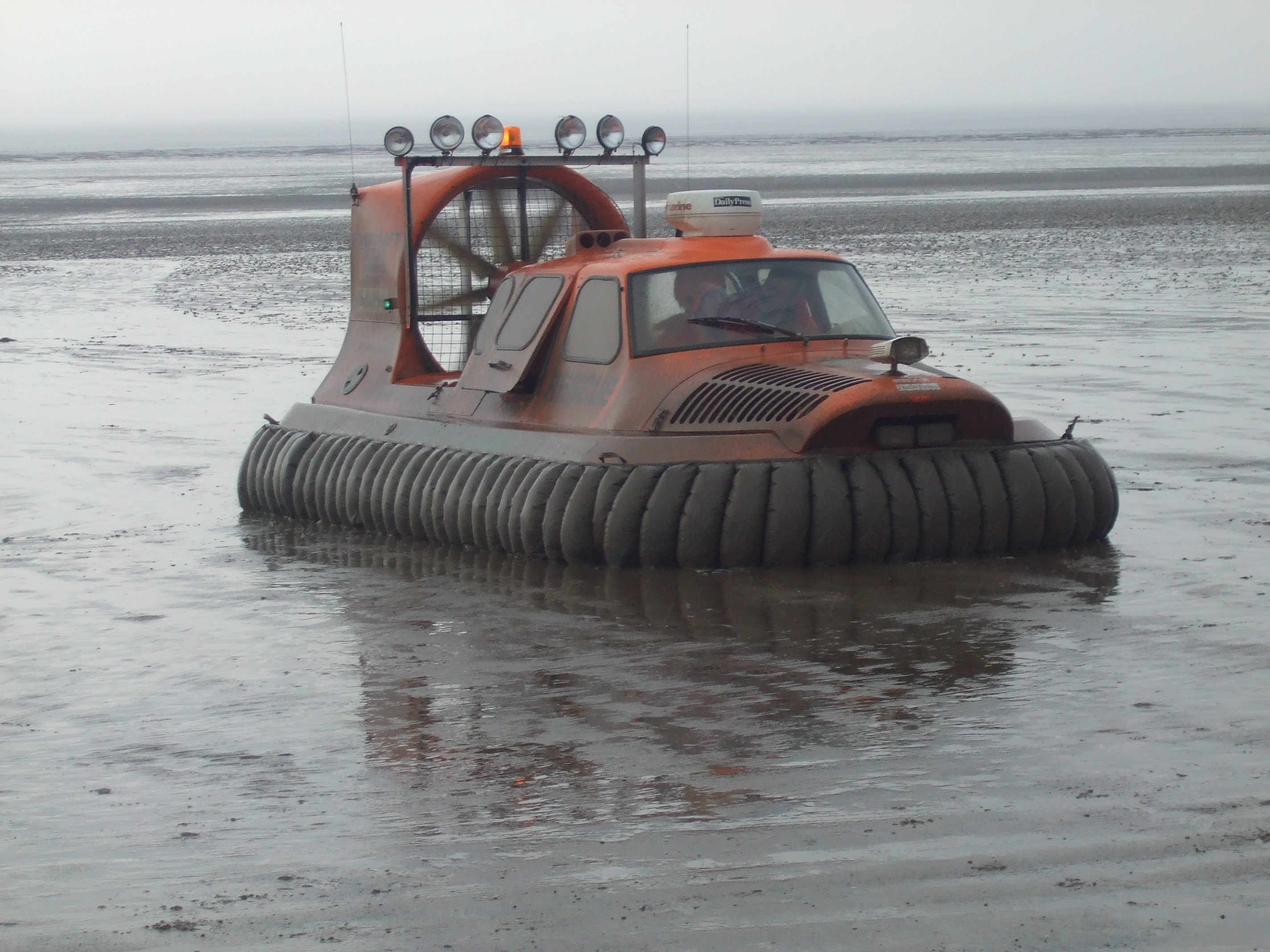
Rescue hovercraft on the sand/mud at Brean

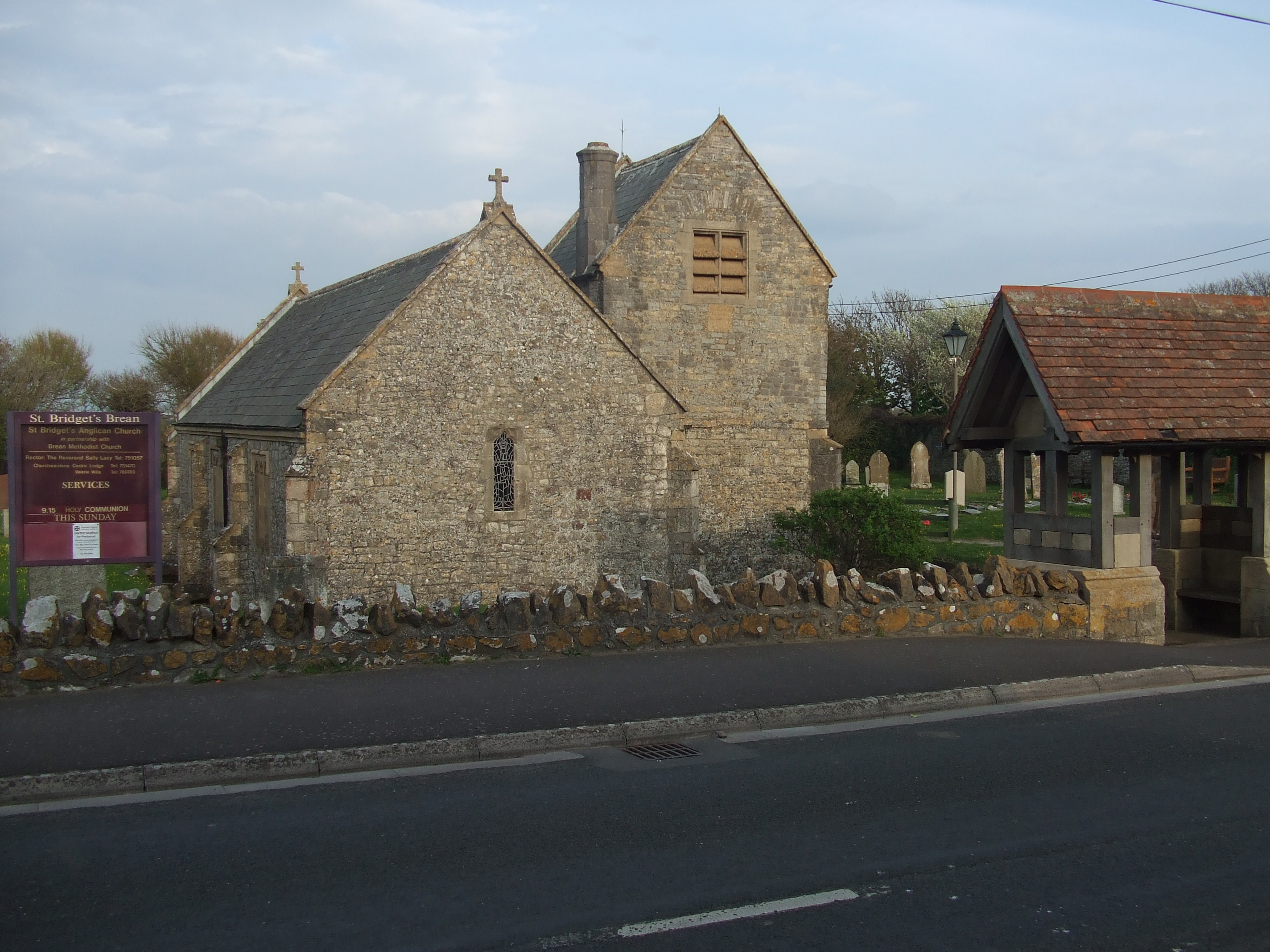
St Bridget's Church

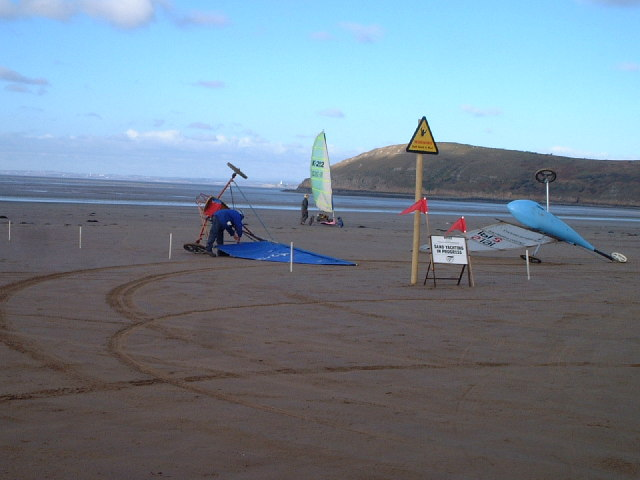
Land yachts on the beach at Brean

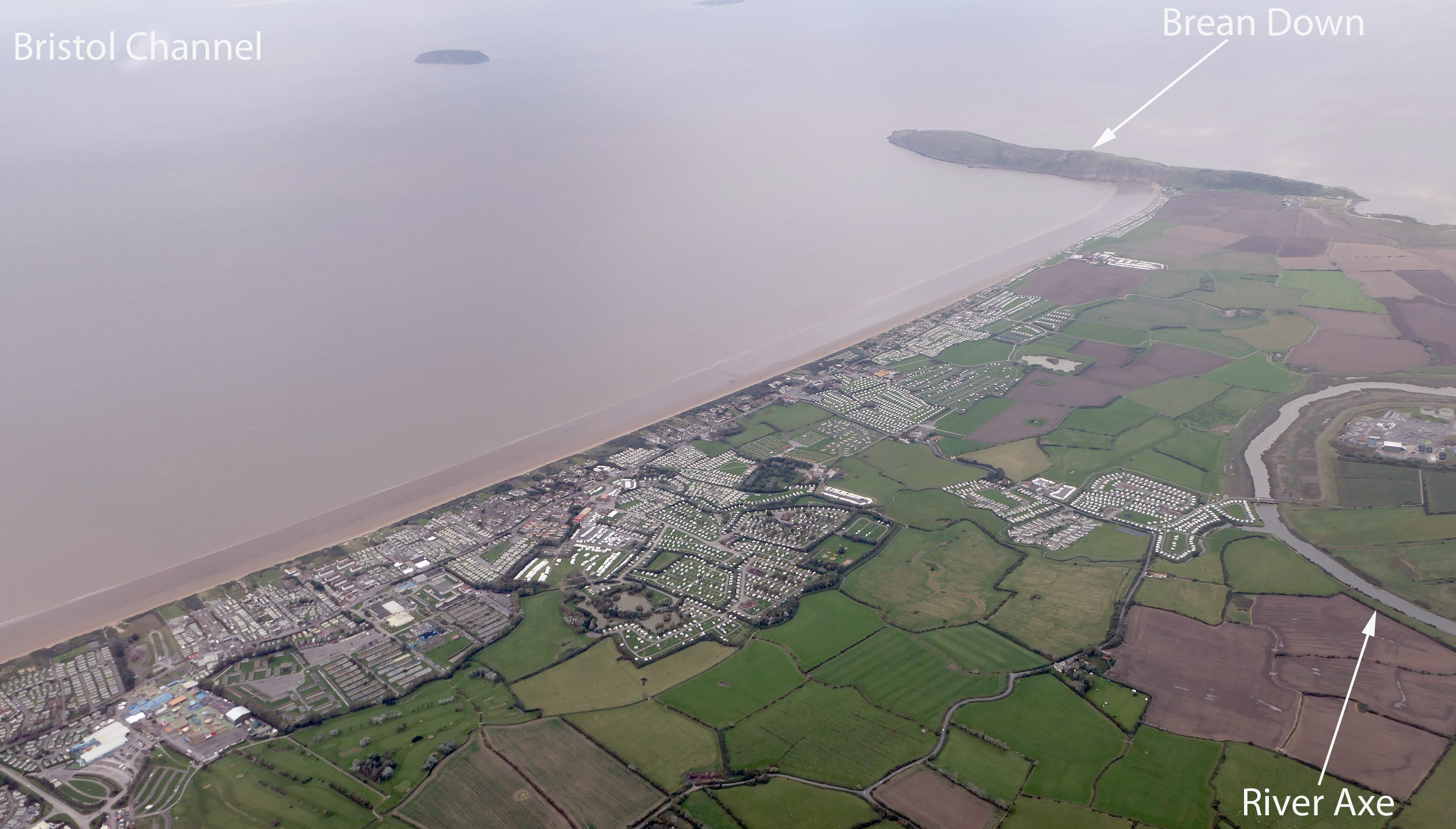
Aerial view of Brean.
