= European Union Maritime Security Strategy =

Maritime security strategy of the European Union

The European Union Maritime Security Strategy (EUMSS, EU MSS or EU Maritime Security Strategy) is a maritime security strategy of the European Union. It was first adopted by EU member states in June 2014 and later revised in 2023 due to geopolitical changes. It provides a framework for the EU's actions within maritime security to promote more coherent approaches to identified maritime security challenges.

The applicable EUMSS from 2023 builds upon the principles from the earlier EUMSS, where maritime security is defined as "a state of affairs of the global maritime domain in which international law and national law are enforced, freedom of navigation is guaranteed and citizens, infrastructure, transport, the environment and marine resources are protected". The strategy aims to safeguard freedom of navigation, protect maritime infrastructure, and respond to evolving threats such as piracy, cyberattacks, and environmental degradation. By integrating maritime security into broader EU policies, the EUMSS seeks to strengthen the EU's role as a global maritime actor while promoting stability and sustainable use of the seas.

== History ==
=== Early maritime activities, before 2014 ===
Before the adoption of the European Union Maritime Security Strategy (EUMSS) in 2014, the EU had different policies where maritime initiatives were mentioned leaving the unified maritime activities fragmented. Furthermore, all maritime operations were done through the Common Security and Defense Policy (CSDP). Early initiatives include Operation Atalanta, launched in 2008, which targeted piracy off the coast of Somalia, and later Operation Sophia in 2015, aimed at disrupting human smuggling networks in the Mediterranean, and Operation Irini in 2020. However, due to the fragmentation of EU maritime initiatives on different policy areas, the operations and interest were not secured efficiently.

The first idea for a unified european maritime security strategy, was brought forward at a defense meeting by Spain, who held the Presidency of the Council of the European Union in 2010. The idea met resistance from several Member States including the UK and Germany who opposed integration in defense policy due to concerns about the loss of sovereignty. They rejected any text that explicitly referenced a possible unified maritime security strategy for the EU. As a result, an adoption of a unified strategy was impossible.

In 2013 a study by the European Parliament’s Directorate General was published, which emphasized the need for a unified maritime strategy due to the following challenges:

1. emerging threat to global maritime governance systems posed by non-state actors such as pirates, terrorists, and criminal syndicates.
2. a growth in competitive tensions, pressures, and bottlenecks due to the interconnectedness of maritime infrastructures across regions.
3. a shift in the global maritime balance due to the emergence of “rising powers”.
4. increased difficulty in securing international cooperation and effective global governance in a complex environment

Geopolitical changes pushed the member states towards a constructive discussion. These changes were mainly Russia’s annexation of Crimea, China's beginning maritime aggressions in the South China sea, growing international interest in the Arctic, as well as threats to EUs interest in the North-Western Indian Ocean and Gulf of Guinea. In addition, member states were concerned about their economy due to changes in shipping and economic pressure from the earlier financial crisis.

=== European Union Maritime Security Strategy (EUMSS) 2014 ===
In 2014 the Member States begun to discuss how a maritime strategy should look like. Member States fell in one of two groups on the matter. One group of Member States supported more references to NATO and fewer supranational regulations. This group included the United Kingdom, Lithuania, Latvia, Estonia, Malta, Netherlands, Bulgaria, Romania, Sweden and Denmark. The other group supported deeper integration on matters of maritime security, and of EU security in general. This group included France, Spain, Italy, Portugal, Ireland, Finland, Belgium and Luxembourg among others. In the final strategy, references to NATO were kept and four supranational regulations were removed.

The EUMSS 2014 was followed by an action plan, and a revised action plan in 2018. Both plans build upon the following principles:

1. cross-sectoral approach
2. functional integrity
3. respect for rules and principles
4. maritime multilateralism

It contains 130 actions across the five work-strands: external action; maritime awareness; capability development; risk management; protection of critical maritime infrastructure and crisis response; and maritime security research and innovation, education, and training. The plan specifics which actors are responsible for implementing the specific action. The European Commission and the High Representative are jointly responsible for reporting on the implementation of the action plan. Each implementation report is based on the contributions from EU member states. The result of the first two implementation reports was the adoption of a revised action plan.

In 2018 the action plan was revised, to ensure that EU's policy response remains fit. It addressed global maritime challenges through a two-part structure: horizontal issues like cybersecurity and critical infrastructure, and regional threats such as instability in the Gulf of Guinea and the Mediterranean.

=== European Maritime Security Strategy (EUMSS) 2023 ===
In 2023 the EU revised the EUMSS because of evolving global threats. The aim of the revised strategy is to make sure that EU can address new security threats, especially regarding growing strategic competition for power and resources in the sea basins around the EU and beyond, environmental degradation, and hybrid and cyber-attacks targeting maritime infrastructure. Furthermore, the world is getting increasingly complex and multi-layered. This is exemplified by Russia's military aggression against Ukraine and the negative spill-over effects on the European economy. Other challenges to maritime security include violations of national sovereignty and threats to freedom of navigation and rights of innocent passage. Regional tensions are identified within and beyond Europe, including the Gulf of Guinea, the Gulf of Aden, the Strait of Hormuz, and the Strait of Malacca. The Indo-Pacific is characterized as “an area of intense geopolitical competition” that undermines global security and affects key shipping routes. The strategy also highlights the impacts of climate change and marine pollution, such as flooding and depleting fish stocks, which worsen inequalities and maritime crime, and the rising threat of hybrid and cyber-attacks on critical maritime infrastructure, such as the 2022 Nord Stream pipeline sabotage. The strategy calls for better protection of undersea cables, pipelines, ports, and ships, aligning with EU initiatives like the Critical Entities Resilience Directive and NIS2 Directive to enhance infrastructure security.

EUMSS 2023 was followed by an action plan, focusing on:

- Step up activities at sea
- Cooperate with partners
- Lead on maritime domain awareness
- Manage risks and threats
- Boost capabilities
- Educate and train

Each section includes a list of key EU actions that are necessary to meet the stated objectives in the updated EUMSS. These actions include:

- naval exercises at the EU-level
- deeper cooperation with NATO and other international partners
- secure information exchange between national and EU authorities
- monitoring and protecting critical maritime infrastructure
- developing common requirements for defence technologies
- investing in hybrid and cyber security qualifications

The updated EUMSS and the action plan set out a path towards increasing the EU's international maritime security role, in line with the EU Strategic Compass for Security and Defence.

=== Challenges and limitations for the EUMSS efficiency ===
EUMSS 2014 and 2023 marks progress in establishing the EU as a maritime security actor. However, the strategy and its action plans faces challenges which needs to be addressed:

1. The union must clarify whether the EU aims to compete with global powers like China, Russia, and the U.S., or prioritize combating maritime crimes. If this is not addressed a consequence is, that the EU will appear as a weak and unreliable partner, which will hurt their goal of becoming a maritime power.
2. There is a need of an alignment of member states' maritime policies is critical for unified EU action. Disparities in national interests pose a challenge, requiring enhanced information sharing tools, which depend on political will. One solution for this requires that the EU is expanding their information sharing tools, but this requires political will from the member states.
3. The EU's Command and Control (C2) structures are fragmented, with inadequate resources for maritime surveillance and naval vessels. This limits the effectiveness of EU operations in key maritime regions.

Overcoming these obstacles will be crucial for the EU to fully realize its maritime security ambitions and strengthen its position as a global maritime power.

== The Coordinated Maritime Presence concept, 2021 ==
The Coordinated Maritime Presences (CMP) concept was introduced in 2019 and adopted in 2021 as a way for the EU to enhance it maritime presence in a flexible way. The concept is an extension of the EUMSS, as it operationalizes the strategic interests mentioned, such as maintaining a continuous EU maritime presence in key regions, ensuring freedom of navigation, and protecting critical maritime infrastructure. The CMP was developed as an alternative to CSDP operations, which have been criticized for being rigid and inefficient due to their requirement for Council approval and the creation of new structures for each mission. In contrast, CMP operations are voluntary, relying on existing naval and air assets contributed by member states in Maritime Areas of Interest (MAI). A CMP operation only operations in MAI’s which is areas appointed by the European Council. The coordination for each operation is coordinated by the EU’s Maritime Area of Interest Coordination Cell (MAICC), but each vessel is still operating under national command. The MAICC supports information sharing, situational awareness, and operational alignment among participating member states. It utilizes tools like the Maritime Surveillance (MARSUR) network to ensure efficient communication and interoperability during missions. The concept focuses on stopping illegal and illicit activities at sea, including human trafficking, drug trafficking, piracy, and IUU (Illegal, Unreported, and Unregulated) fishing.

CMP deployments operate on a voluntary basis, allowing each member state to retain command over its naval assets while contributing to shared EU objectives. This makes it more flexible for member states to contribute to operations when it aligns with their national interests, and the union avoids disputes regarding further european integration.

=== Operations ===
The first pilot CMP operation was in the Gulf of Guinea and aimed to combat piracy in 2021. As the operation proved efficient, it became an initiative by itself in 2022. The CMP’s main objective was to enhance maritime security by increasing the EU’s naval presence, deploying up to four EU naval assets concurrently in the region. This continuous presence, coupled with intelligence sharing and operational coordination, significantly improved situational awareness and contributed to a decline in piracy-related incidents. In addition to military support, the CMP focused on capacity-building through training programs for local forces, helping regional nations strengthen their maritime security capabilities. The EU also supported the Yaoundé Architecture, a regional maritime security framework, ensuring its efforts aligned with local priorities. Diplomatically, the Senior Coordinator appointed within the European External Action Service (EEAS) gave the CMP greater visibility and political weight, fostering stronger ties with regional countries. Key events, such as those in Nigeria and Togo, reinforced the EU’s role as a security provider in the region. The CMP’s success led to its extension in 2022, with the initiative now serving as a model for future EU maritime security efforts in other regions. The Gulf of Guinea remains a priority for the EU, which aims to consolidate its role and continue strengthening regional maritime security.

In 2022 the Council appointed another MAI in the North-Western Indian Ocean, where the CMP concept will secure international law and freedom of navigation, especially with focus on the Red sea and the strait of Hormuz. These area possesses tense geopolitical conflicts, which marks a strategic shift in the EU approach and influence in geopolitical significant areas. However, as the Operation Atalanta also takes place in this area, EU already has significant partners, and the operations makes it possible to strengthen maritime security partnerships with countries like India, Japan, and South Korea.

=== Challenges and limitations for the CMP ===
Despite its advantages, the CMP faces several challenges. Its success depends on effective coordination, voluntary participation from member states, and the ability to engage with regional partners. The absence of a centralized command structure can complicate operations, particularly in complex geopolitical environments like the Indo-Pacific, where increasing competition with China may strain policy alignment among EU member states and regional actor. Additionally, resource constraints and inconsistent information sharing among participants pose risks to the CMP’s effectiveness. While its voluntary and flexible nature allows for adaptability, it also creates vulnerabilities if coordination and policy alignment are not strengthened before engaging in geopolitically sensitive regions.

CMP has enhanced the EU's capacity as a global maritime security actor by increasing situational awareness, improving information sharing, and promoting interoperability among member states' naval assets. However, its long-term success will depend on addressing internal and external challenges, including resource limitations and geopolitical tensions, to fully realize its potential as a strategic maritime tool.

== Academic debates on the EU as an international maritime security actor ==
According to the EUMSS, "more action is required of the EU as an international security provider", implying that the union will upscales its maritime initiatives and perhaps engage in global maritime power competition.

The future of the European Union’s maritime engagement is widely discussed among scholars, where the main debate circles whether the EU is becoming a global humanitarian actor or a traditional realist great power. On one hand the EU’s maritime strategy and the CMP concept aims to protect critical maritime infrastructure, address environmental degradation, and combat crimes such as human and drug trafficking. On the other hand, it also signals a pivot toward becoming a geopolitical power, emphasizing strategic competition with global actors like Russia and China. Marianne Riddervold concludes that "the EU indeed is becoming maritime global power" that increasingly turns to military means to respond to "new security threats and challenges, also known as ‘soft threats’ such as piracy and migration". Riddervold does not, however, find evidence that supports a realist hypothesis. Rather, Riddervold concludes that the EUMSS demonstrates that the EU is moving towards a maritime foreign and security policy "more in line with a humanitarian foreign policy model". In contrast, Basil Germond stresses the geopolitical dimension of the EU's efforts in the maritime domain and the collective interests of members states in increasing power projection.

Furthermore, scholars argues that the EUMSS 2023 includes elements that align with the EU’s traditional identity as a normative and humanitarian actor. Its holistic approach to maritime security, focusing on environmental protection and resilience against hybrid threats, is consistent with broader EU policies emphasizing sustainability and collective global security. Efforts to combat illegal, unreported, and unregulated (IUU) fishing, piracy, and human trafficking reflect the EU's commitment to international law and humanitarian values. Additionally, the CMP’s flexible and cooperative framework demonstrates a focus on multilateralism and fostering partnerships, particularly with regional actors such as Japan, India, and South Korea. However, the EU’s growing focus on strategic competition and power projection aligns with realist ambitions. The updated EUMSS emphasizes maritime domain awareness, risk management, and enhanced capabilities to address security threats posed by global powers, including Russia and China. The CMP’s expansion to strategic maritime areas such as the Indo-Pacific and Gulf of Guinea underscores a desire to assert influence in geopolitically significant regions, demonstrating a shift toward the EU acting as a security provider. Moreover, the EU’s increased investment in maritime resilience and the protection of economic interests, such as maritime trade routes, highlights its pursuit of geoeconomic influence. By positioning itself as a maritime security leader, the EU seeks to protect its strategic autonomy and credibility as a global actor.

== See also ==
- Maritime security
- Ocean governance
- United Nations Convention on the Law of the Sea
- Common Foreign and Security Policy
- Common Security and Defence Policy
- Common Information Sharing Environment
- European Union Global Strategy
- European Security Strategy
- Defence forces of the European Union
- List of military and civilian missions of the European Union
- Operation Atalanta
- Operation Sophia
- European Maritime Force
- US maritime strategy
- European Union submarine internet cables

== Bibliography ==
- Barlucchi, Piero (2024). "Sailing through dangerous waves: the EU's expanding toolbox at sea". European Policy Review. 7 (1): 89–99.
- Behr, T.; Brattberg, E.; Kallio, J.; Aaltola, M.; Salonius-Pasternak, C.; Raspotnik, A.; Salonen, M. (2013). The maritime dimension of CSDP: Geostrategic Maritime Challenges and their implications for the European Union. Belgium: European parliament. Retrieved 2. November 2024: https://www.europarl.europa.eu/RegData/etudes/etudes/join/2013/433839/EXPO-SEDE_ET(2013)433839_EN.pdf
- Bosilca, Ruxandra; Riddervold, Marianne (May 2024). "Sink or Swim: The EU as a Strategic Maritime Security Actor". European Foreign Affairs Review. 29 (2): 205–226. doi:10.54648/eerr2024009.
- Bueger, Christian; Edmunds, Timothy (2023). "The European Union's Quest to Become a Global Maritime-Security Provider". Naval War College Review. 76 (2): 67–86. JSTOR 48735674.
- Council of the EU (2014) European Union Maritime Security Strategy. Belgium: Council of the EU. Retrieved 4. November 2024: https://data.consilium.europa.eu/doc/document/ST%2011205%202014%20INIT/EN/pdf
- Council of the EU (2014) European Union Maritime Security Strategy (EUMSS) – Action Plan. Belgium: Council of the EU. Retrieved 10. December 2024: https://data.consilium.europa.eu/doc/document/ST-17002-2014-INIT/en/pdf
- Council of the EU (2018) Council conclusions on the revision of the European Union Maritime Security Strategy (EUMSS) Action plan (26 June 2018). Belgium: Council of the EU. Retrieved 17. October 2024: https://data.consilium.europa.eu/doc/document/ST-10494-2018-INIT/en/pdf
- Council of the EU (2018) Council conclusions on the revision of the European Union Maritime Security Strategy (EUMSS) and Action Plan (26 June 2018). Belgium: Council of the EU. Retrieved 10. December 2024: https://data.consilium.europa.eu/doc/document/ST-10494-2018-INIT/en/pdf
- Council of the EU (2023) Revised EU Maritime Security Strategy (EUMSS) and its Action Plan. Belgium: Council of the EU. Retrieved 17. October 2024: https://www.consilium.europa.eu/media/67499/st14280-en23.pdf
- European Commission (2018). More secure seas and oceans for Europea and around the world. Press release 26/06/2018. Belgium: European Commission. Retrieved 10. December 2024: https://ec.europa.eu/newsroom/mare/items/630409/en
- European Commission (2020). Joint Staff Working Document: Report on the implementation of the revised EU maritime security strategy action plan. Belgium: European Commission. Retrieved 10. December 2024: https://oceans-and-fisheries.ec.europa.eu/system/files/2021-03/swd-2020-252_en.pdf
- European Commission (2023) Joint communication on the update of the EU maritime security strategy and its action plan: An enhanced EU maritime security strategy for evolving maritime threats. Belgium: European Commission. Retrieved 10. December 2024: https://oceans-and-fisheries.ec.europa.eu/system/files/2021-03/swd-2020-252_en.pdf
- European Council (2015) Council Decision (CFSP) 2015/778 of 18 May 2015 on a European Union military operation in the Southern Central Mediterranean (EUNAVFOR MED). Retrieved 10. December 2024: https://eur-lex.europa.eu/legal-content/EN/TXT/?uri=CELEX%3A32015D0778&qid=1684943246420
- European External Action Service (2022). Maritime diplomacy: How Coordinated Maritime Presences (CMP) serves EU interest globally. Belgium: European Union. Retrieved 10. December 2024: https://www.eeas.europa.eu/eeas/maritime-diplomacy-how-coordinated-maritime-presences-cmp-serves-eu-interest-globally_en
- European External Action Service (2024). Coordinated maritime presences.Belgium: European Union. Retrieved 10. December 2024: https://www.eeas.europa.eu/eeas/coordinated-maritime-presences_en#84720
- Germond, Basil (December 2011). "The EU's security and the sea: defining a maritime security strategy". European Security. 20 (4): 563–584. doi:10.1080/09662839.2011.635648.
- Germond, Basil (April 2015). "The geopolitical dimension of maritime security". Marine Policy. 54: 137–142. Bibcode:2015MarPo..54..137G. doi:10.1016/j.marpol.2014.12.013.
- Germond, Basil; Germond-Duret, Celine (April 2016). "Ocean governance and maritime security in a placeful environment: The case of the European Union" (PDF). Marine Policy. 66: 124–131. Bibcode:2016MarPo..66..124G. doi:10.1016/j.marpol.2016.01.010.
- Larsen, J. (2019) The European Union as a security actor – Perspectives form the maritime domain. DIIS report 2019: 06. Retrieved 2. November 2024: https://www.econstor.eu/bitstream/10419/227706/1/1686369468.pdf
- Larsson, Oscar Leonard (2 July 2024). "Sea blindness in grey zone preparations". Defence Studies. 24 (3): 399–420. doi:10.1080/14702436.2024.2359913.
- Nováky, Niklas (April 2022). "The Coordinated Maritime Presences concept and the EU's naval ambitions in the Indo-Pacific". European View. 21 (1): 56–65. doi:10.1177/17816858221089871.
- Riddervold, Marianne (2018). "EU Maritime Foreign and Security Policy Integration: Explaining the EU Maritime Security Strategy". The Maritime Turn in EU Foreign and Security Policies. pp. 143–164. doi:10.1007/978-3-319-66598-6_7. ISBN 978-3-319-66597-9.
- SafeSeas (2017). Maritime security capacity building: Spotting the gaps. SafeSeas concept note, nr. 1, January 2017. Retrieved 10. December 2024: https://www.safeseas.net/wp-content/uploads/2017/01/SAFESEAS-Concept-Note-1-Spotting-the-gaps.pdf
- Sobrino-Heredia, J. M. (2022). The European Union as a Maritime Security Actor in the Gulf of Guinea: From Its Strategy and Action Plan to the New Concept of “Coordinated Maritime Presences”. Ocean Development & International Law, 53(2–3), 105–122. Retrieved 4. November 2024: https://portalinvestigacion.udc.gal/documentos/62a4ffa3fc16bd0a02fbfd0a?lang=en
- Stöhs, J. (2024) European Naval Power: From Cold War to Hybrid Wars. Austria: Palgrave Macmillian.
- Suri, M. (2023). Explaining EU Maritime Security Cooperation through the Coordinated Maritime Presences Tool.Info Flash Finabel, January 2023, 1–6. Retrieved 4. November 2024: https://finabel.org/wp-content/uploads/2023/01/Explaining-EU-Maritime-Security-Cooperation-through-the-Coordinated-Maritime-Presences-Tool.pdf
- Vai, Lorenzo (2016). "The European Union's Maritime Security Strategy: Cogito Ergo Sum?". Italy and Security in the Mediterranean. Istituto Affari Internazionali. pp. 93–108. JSTOR resrep09859.9.
- van Willigen, Niels; Blarel, Nicolas (13 February 2024). "Why, how and to whom is the European Union signalling in the Indo-Pacific? Understanding the European Union's strategy in the Indo-Pacific in the epicentre of multipolar competition". The British Journal of Politics and International Relations. doi:10.1177/13691481241230857. hdl:1887/4176829.
