= GTT Communications =

Tier 1 Internet service provider

GTT Communications, Inc.
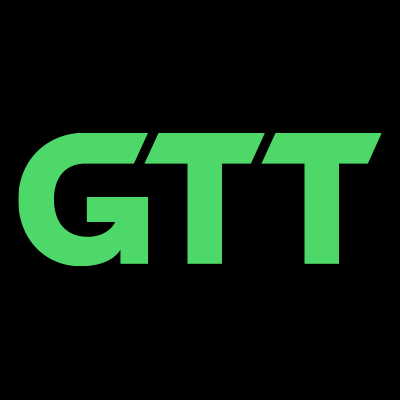
- Type: Private
- Industry: Telecommunications
- Founded: 1998
- Headquarters: Arlington, Virginia, United States
- Area served: Worldwide
- Key people: Edward Morche (CEO and board director), Fletcher Keister (CPTO), Mike Little (CCO),
- Products: Internet; Voice over Internet Protocol (VoIP); Wide Area Networking; SD-WAN; Secure Access Service Edge (SASE); Network Security; Cloud Security; Multi-Protocol Label Switching (MPLS); Managed and Professional Services
- Number of employees: 2,200 (January 2023)
- ASN: 3257
- Peering policy: Restrictive
- Traffic Levels: 10 Tbit/s+
- Website: gtt.net

GTT Communications, Inc. (GTT), formerly Global Telecom and Technology, is a Network as a Service (NaaS) and Security as a Service (SECaaS) provider headquartered in Arlington, Virginia. GTT operates a Tier 1 IP network and provides Internet; wide area networking, SD-WAN; network security, voice and video transport services.

== History ==
In 1998, telecom services integrator Global Internetworking Inc. was founded in McLean, Virginia. That same year, European Telecom and Technology was founded in London. Mercator Partners, a special-purpose acquisition company bought Global Internetworking Inc. in April 2005 and European Telecommunications & Technology in 2006. The operations of the companies were merged and renamed Global Telecom & Technology, Inc. In December 2009, GTT acquired Denver-based WBS Connect in a stock and cash transaction, shifting its business model to a network operator providing IP transit and Ethernet services. It then acquired PacketExchange, a privately held UK company and operator of a global IP backbone, in June 2011 for $20 million in cash. This was followed in May 2012 by the acquisition of nLayer Communications, a privately held global IP backbone, for $18 million. and in April 2013 the acquisition of Tier 1 IP network, Tinet (formerly Tiscali International Network), from Inteliquent for $54.5 million resulting in Tier 1 status for GTT's global IP network. In June 2013 GTT was listed on the New York Stock Exchange, under the symbol GTT.

On January 14, 2014, GTT officially changed its name to GTT Communications, Inc. In February 2014, GTT announced opening a new office in Hong Kong's Central District, bringing its total to 9 offices in 6 countries. In October 2014, GTT announced it had closed the acquisition of UNSi, a communications company providing data services to large enterprise and carrier clients.

On February 19, 2015, GTT entered into a definitive agreement to acquire MegaPath’s managed services business, which provides private wide-area-networking, Internet access services, managed services and managed security to multinational clients. On October 22, 2015, GTT acquired One Source Networks (OSN), a provider of data, Internet, Session Initiation Protocol (SIP) trunking and managed services.

On February 9, 2016, GTT acquired Telnes Broadband for $18 million. On October 7, 2016, GTT announced the award of Government Services Administrations (GSA) IT Schedule 70 Contract. The IT Schedule 70 is the largest acquisition vehicle in the United States federal government.

On January 9, 2017, GTT completed the acquisition of Hibernia Networks for $590 million. The company acquired five subsea cables, including Hibernia Express (now GTT Express), a low latency transatlantic cable system. In May, GTT purchased IP broker and aggregator Giglinx, for $21 million. On June 19, GTT announced it was acquiring Perseus Telecom, a provider of low latency services for the financial market industry, for $37.5 million. On June 26, GTT announced it was acquiring Massachusetts-based telecommunications provider Global Capacity, for $100 million and 1.85 million shares of GTT common stock. The deal closed on September 18.

In January 2018, GTT announced the acquisition of Custom Connect, an Amsterdam-headquartered provider of high speed network connectivity for multinational enterprises and financial services firms. On February 26, GTT announced the acquisition of Interoute, operator of one of Europe's largest independent fiber networks and cloud networking platforms, for approximately €1.9 billion ($2.3 billion) in cash. The deal subsequently closed on May 31. On March 12, GTT expanded its Canadian footprint by acquiring Toronto-based telecommunications company Accelerated Connections. On October 1, GTT acquired Cary, North Carolina-based Access Point, a provider of communications services in the US market.

On December 2, 2019, GTT completed its acquisition of KPN International, a division of Netherlands-based telecommunications company KPN N.V., operating a global IP network serving enterprise and carrier clients.

On October 16, 2020, GTT announced an agreement with I Squared Capital to sell the infrastructure division of GTT. The division consists of a pan-European, North American, and subsea fiber network and data center assets and associated infrastructure services provided to customers which were acquired by GTT through the Hibernia, Interoute and KPN International acquisitions.

On August 2, 2021, The New York Stock Exchange delisted GTT Communications' shares after it failed to file its quarterly and annual results.

On September 2, 2021, GTT announced that the company and certain U.S.-based subsidiaries planned to file for Chapter 11 bankruptcy in the U.S. Bankruptcy Court for the Southern District of New York as part of a Pre-packaged insolvency agreement, following the completion of the sale of its infrastructure division. The company said it expected to continue operating without interruption, with the support of its lenders.

On September 17, 2021, GTT completed the long-anticipated sale of its infrastructure division to Miami-based I Squared Capital for total cash considerations of approximately $1.74 billion, with other cash amounts anticipated to be paid to GTT in the future, contingent on certain milestones.

On December 16, 2021, the United States Bankruptcy Court for the Southern District of New York approved GTT’s Prepackaged Chapter 11 bankruptcy plan. The Prepackaged Plan enables GTT to improve its capital structure and execute its long-term business strategy.

On Dec 30, 2022, GTT completed its financial restructuring process and emerged from its chapter 11 cases.

On September 24, 2024, GTT announced the launch of GTT Envision, a single global technology platform designed to connect, orchestrate, virtualize, and automate enterprise networks. The platform integrates the technology of EnvisionCORE and EnvisionEDGE, enabling the virtual deployment of orchestrated network functions anywhere. This functionality is managed, customized, and controlled through a single digital interface called EnvisionDX.

GTT leverages this platform to offer new services. In November 2024 the company announced the virtualization of its Managed Dedicated Internet Access service, enabled through the GTT Envision platform.

== Operations ==
The company operates a network of over 450 points of presence (PoPs). The network spans six continents, and provides services to clients in more than 170 countries.

=== Internet ===
As of 2019, GTT was one of the five largest Internet backbones in terms of traffic. The company's high speed Internet services include IP transit, dedicated internet access and broadband internet services. GTT also operates a 100% native dual stack (IPv4 and IPv6) carrier class network built on optical infrastructure.

=== Wide area networking ===
GTT provides WAN services, including SD-WAN, VPLS, MPLS, and Ethernet point-to-point services, which are transported across the company's Tier 1 global IP network.
