= MegaPath =

Defunct telecommunicatons service

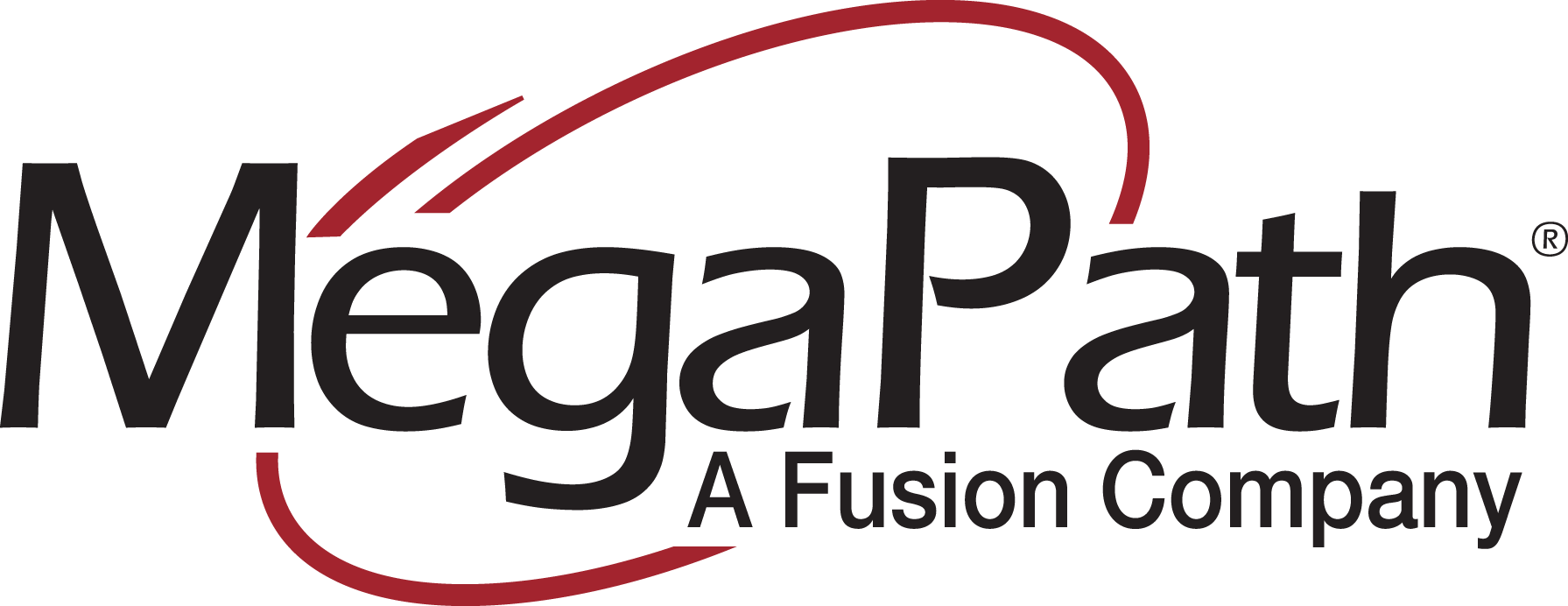
- Company type: Private company
- Industry: Telecommunications
- Founded: 1996; 30 years ago
- Defunct: 2018; 8 years ago
- Fate: Acquired by Fusion Connect
- Headquarters: Atlanta, Georgia, U.S.
- Key people: Brian Crotty, CEO
- Products: Voice, Unified Communications, Ethernet, Data communications, MPLS, security, cloud computing
- Owner: Fusion Connect
- Number of employees: 300+
- Website: www.megapath.com

MegaPath was a business telecommunications company. Founded in 1996, it provided voice, unified communications, internet access, Managed Security Services, and cloud computing services to carrier and service-provider businesses in the United States. The company was headquartered in Pleasanton, California.

In 2018, MegaPath was acquired by cloud service provider Fusion Connect for $71.5 million.

== History ==
The company was founded in 1996. Over the next several years the company made acquisitions of other vendors: Phoenix Networks in 2000, Epoch Networks in 2002, TManage in 2003, the services operation of Aventail Corporation in 2005, IP Merchant Solutions in 2007, and DSL.net in 2009.

In 2010, MegaPath acquired the voice communications specialists Speakeasy and the network provider Covad, which they merged with their existing portfolio of MPLS and managed services to form a single company.

In 2012 the company acquired IP5280. and also completed a nationwide Ethernet over copper (EoC) network expansion.

In 2014, MegaPath launched its Unified Communications service. Around the same time, the Chicago-based services company, Global Capacity, announced a definitive agreement with MegaPath to acquire MegaPath's Wholesale Network Services business unit. MegaPath and Global Capacity finalized this transaction on January 6, 2015. Upon closing of the transaction, MegaPath announced it will focus on driving growth and expanding its core value-added Voice, Data, Security and Cloud services.

In 2015, the company sold its wholesale division, along with a portion of its managed services business to Global Capacity, and announced plans to focus resources and investments more heavily on the high-growth cloud and unified communications markets.

In 2018, MegaPath was acquired by cloud service provider Fusion Connect, a telecom company previous called Fusion Telecommunications International, for $71.5 million.

== Voice services ==
MegaPath offered hosted voice services for single-site and multi-site businesses. Its voice services support calling features including find me/follow me, visual voicemail, call recording and mobile integration, aiming to reduce the costs and complexity of managing and maintaining a PBX. Its SIP trunking and enterprise trunking services are designed to allow customers to use the features of VoIP with their existing PBX equipment.

In July 2014, MegaPath announced a partnership with CounterPath Corporation to deliver CounterPath Bria desktop, tablet and mobile unified communications services through MegaPath's Hosted Voice service. The Unified Communications solution include presence, instant messaging, screen sharing collaboration, text messaging, fixed-mobile convergence, and video conferencing.

== Cloud services ==
MegaPath Cloud services included cloud hosting, hosted exchange, hosted data backup, and hosted Microsoft SharePoint.

== Managed security services ==
MegaPath offered security services such as private networking, which include MPLS, IPsec and SSL VPN services for connecting geographically distributed and mobile workforces. MegaPath also provided unified threat management services which include anti-virus and anti-spyware protection, intrusion detection, and web filtering. The company also offered Compliance Services that solves log, vulnerability, and security information management issues, such as PCI compliance.
