= Hibernia Networks =

American telecommunications company

- Company type: Public
- Industry: Telecommunications
- Fate: Acquired by GTT Communications in January, 2017
- Headquarters: McLean, Virginia, United States
- Area served: Worldwide
- Products: Telecommunications, submarine communications cable
- Website: gtt.net

Hibernia Networks, alternately known as Hibernia Atlantic, was a privately held, US-owned provider of telecommunication services. It operated global network routes on self-healing rings in North America, Europe and Asia including submarine communications cable systems in the North Atlantic Ocean which connected Canada, the United States, the Republic of Ireland, the United Kingdom and mainland Europe. Hibernia managed cable landing stations in Dublin, Republic of Ireland; Coleraine, Northern Ireland; Southport, England; Halifax, Canada; Lynn, Massachusetts, United States.

Hibernia's network provided service, from 2.5 Gbit/s to 100 Gbit/s wavelengths and Ethernet from 10 Mbit/s to 100 Gbit/s. It also provided traditional SONET/SDH services.

In January 2017, the company was acquired and absorbed into GTT Communications, Inc. It was previously a subsidiary of Columbia Ventures Corporation (CVC) and was owned by both CVC and Constellation Ventures Partners.

== History ==
Hibernia Networks' transatlantic cable system was originally built in 2000 by Tyco Submarine Systems for 360networks for $962M. It was placed in receivership in 2001, purchased in 2003 and began carrying traffic in 2005. In 2007 Hibernia announced that Huawei Technologies USA had been selected to upgrade Hibernia's 24,520 kilometers of the submarine and terrestrial network throughout the US, Canada, the UK, and Europe.

In December 2009, Hibernia Networks acquired managed network services company MediaXstream.

Hibernia Networks provided financial customers and the trading community low-latency routes to financial exchanges and data centers. On September 30, 2010, Hibernia announced plans for a new transatlantic cable, Project Express, to be built from the NY metro area to the town of Slough, west of London, with less than 60 ms of delay. This cable system targeted traders and was planned to be the highest bit rate (8.8 terabits/second), lowest latency (59 ms) cable built across the Atlantic.

In 2011, Hibernia announced its expansion into the Pacific Rim with network connectivity into Tokyo, Singapore and Hong Kong.

In August 2012, the company acquired the Media Connect assets from TeliaSonera International Carrier (TSIC), located in Europe and the US, and rebranded as Hibernia Networks. This made Hibernia Networks one of the largest DTM Video Transport Networks in the world. The company operated in European and North American markets and transported content across its optical switching and dynamic transport mode network.

On September 18, 2012 Hibernia announced it was contracted by global infrastructure provider Voxility to provide European and transatlantic capacity between the company's data centers in North America, United Kingdom and Germany.

In 2013, the company acquired Atrato IP Networks, a provider of IP and transit services.

In 2014 Hibernia, together with TE SubCom, a TE Connectivity Ltd. company, announced the commencement of the new 4,600 km submarine cable system that will provide the lowest-latency fiber-optic path between New York and London. In June, 2016 the two companies received the GTB Innovation Award for Fixed Infrastructure.

On January 9, 2017, Hibernia was acquired for $607 million (initial price was $590 million) by telecommunications provider GTT Communications, Inc.

== Cable landing stations ==
360atlantic (Hibernia Atlantic)
- Owners: GTT Communications, Inc..
- Landing points: 1. Herring Cove, Nova Scotia, Canada; 2. Lynn, Massachusetts, US; 3. Dublin, Republic of Ireland; 4. Southport, England; 5. Coleraine, Northern Ireland; 6. Brean, England
- Design capacity: 10.16 Tbit/s
- Technology: Fiber Optic DWDM

Hibernia's network had cable landing stations in:

1. Herring Cove, Nova Scotia, Canada 44°33′41.2″N 63°33′40.1″W
2. Lynn, Essex County, Massachusetts, United States 42°27′33.8″N 70°57′38.2″W
3. Dublin, County Dublin, Republic of Ireland, Sutton (from Herring Cove)/Baldoyle (to Ainsdale Sands)53°24′40.1″N 6°12′58.4″W
4. Southport (Ainsdale Sands), Lancashire, England 53°37′38.5″N 2°59′4.7″W
5. Brean, Somerset, England 51°17′10.1″N 3°00′27.3″W

An additional landing point was established in Coleraine, County Londonderry (under Project Kelvin), Northern Ireland, United Kingdom.
