= Le Porge =

Le Porge Lo Pòrge (Occitan)
- Commune
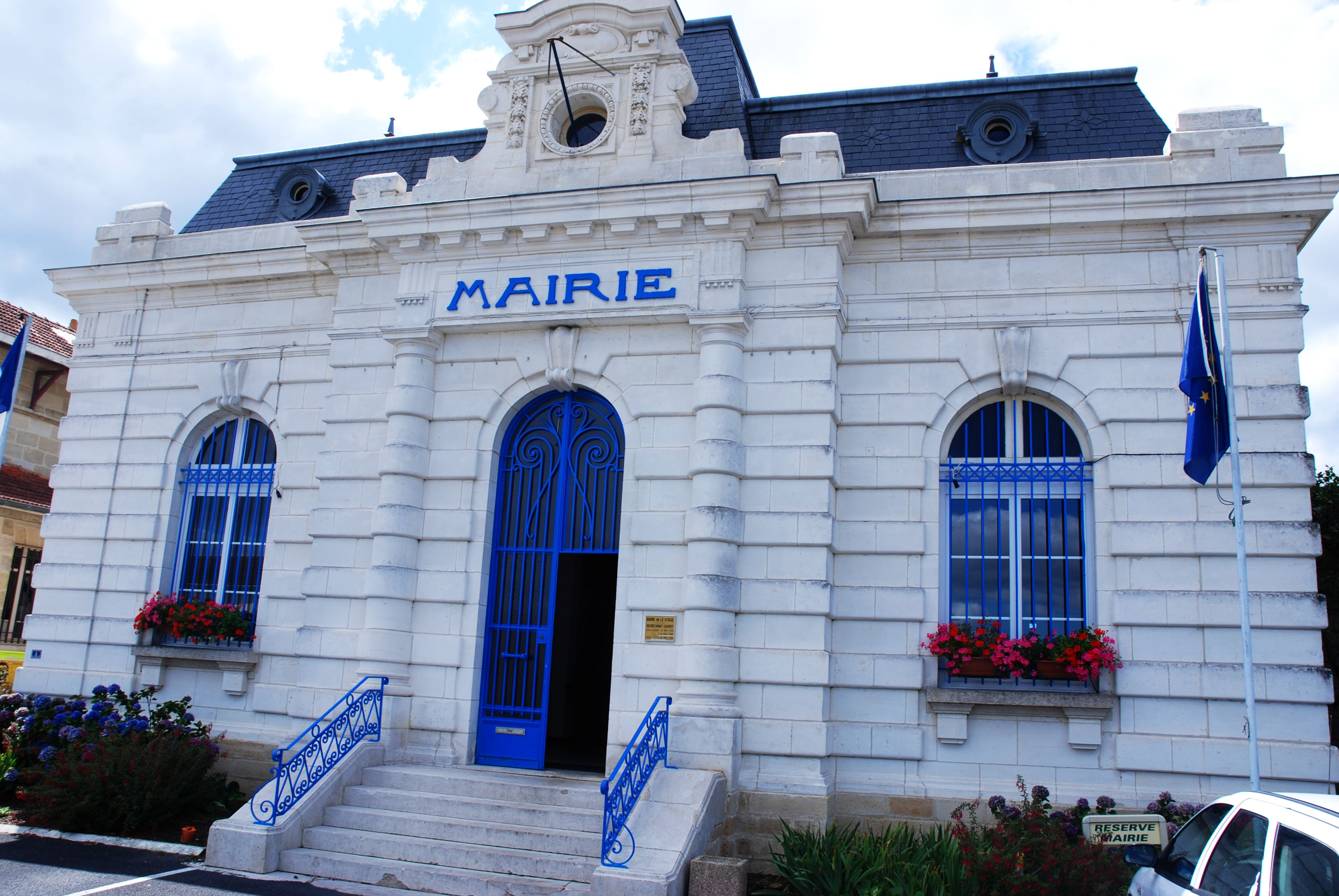
- Le Porge Town Hall
- Location of Le Porge
- Location within France Location within Nouvelle-Aquitaine
- Coordinates: 44°52′25″N 1°05′27″W
- Country: France
- Region: Nouvelle-Aquitaine
- Department: Gironde
- Arrondissement: Lesparre-Médoc
- Canton: Le Sud-Médoc
- Intercommunality: Médulienne

Government
  - Mayor (2020–2026): Sophie Brana
- Area^{1}: 149.03 km^{2} (57.54 sq mi)
- Elevation: 22 m (72 ft)
- Highest elevation: 50 m (160 ft)
- Lowest elevation: 0 m (0 ft)
- Population (2023): 3,465
  - Density: 23.25/km^{2} (60.22/sq mi)
- Demonym: Porgeais
- Time zone: UTC+01:00 (CET)
  - Summer (DST): UTC+02:00 (CEST)
- INSEE/Postal code: 33333 /33680
- Website: www.mairie-leporge.fr
- ^{1} French Land Register data, which excludes lakes, ponds, glaciers > 1 km^{2} (0.386 sq mi or 247 acres) and river estuaries.

Le Porge (French pronunciation: [lə pɔʁʒ]; Occitan: Lo Pòrge) is a coastal commune in the Gironde department in the Nouvelle-Aquitaine region in Southwestern France.

== Demographics ==
Historical population
| Year | Pop. | ±% p.a. |
|---|---|---|
| 1968 | 1,149 | — |
| 1975 | 1,058 | −1.17% |
| 1982 | 1,100 | +0.56% |
| 1990 | 1,230 | +1.41% |
| 1999 | 1,507 | +2.28% |
| 2007 | 2,298 | +5.42% |
| 2012 | 2,607 | +2.56% |
| 2017 | 3,185 | +4.09% |
| 2023 | 3,465 | +1.41% |
Source: INSEE

== See also ==
- Communes of the Gironde department
- Amitié (submarine communications cable)
