= Speakeasy (ISP) =

Defunct internet service provider

Speakeasy, Inc.
- Industry: Internet & Communications
- Founded: Seattle, Washington, United States (1996; 30 years ago)
- Defunct: 2010; 16 years ago
- Fate: Merged with Covad into MegaPath
- Successor: MegaPath
- Headquarters: Seattle, Washington, United States
- Key people: Michael Apgar, Founder; Bruce A. Chatterley, President & CEO
- Products: ISP, VoIP
- Parent: MegaPath Corporation
- Website: speakeasy.net

Speakeasy, Inc. was a broadband internet service provider and voice over IP carrier based in Seattle, Washington, United States. Their terms of service described liberal usage policies for home users allowing subscribers to run any number of servers and allowing them to resell their connectivity to others through a service called "NetShare". They received press coverage for their support of Linux and BSD-derivative operating systems, and were reportedly the first provider to offer a customized version of Mozilla Firefox to customers, in January 2005. The company was acquired by MegaPath Corporation in 2010 which retired the Speakeasy brand. MegaPath in turn was acquired by Fusion Connect which currently houses Speakeasy's network and customers.

== History ==
In 1994, Gretchen Apgar and her husband Mike opened a cybercafe in Seattle's Belltown neighborhood with Mike's brother Tyler. They started out with offering connectivity and email services in the area. Customers at the cafe expressed a wish to have the ability to check their email from other locations than just the cafe and a series of terminal stations were set up at various bars around town. These terminals were marketed under the label, "Rainmail." As computing power expanded and the cost of computers diminished, customers began to express the further wish to access their email from home. Speakeasy put together a bank of modems and offered a dial up service. As of 2008, dialup through Speakeasy is still available for $19 a month. The move toward DSL took place in 1998.

In late 1999, the company expanded to a national level, offering DSL services throughout the United States. The Speakeasy backbone consisted of a dedicated fiber ring that circled the continental United States with major points of presence (i.e. POPs) in Seattle, San Francisco, Los Angeles, Dallas, Atlanta, Washington D.C., New York, and Chicago. From the POP to the customers premises Covad was contracted to provide data layer connectivity. This is known in networking as the 'last mile'. In the case of Speakeasy, the data-link protocol used was Asynchronous Transfer Mode rather than PPPoE or Frame Relay in case of T1's.

In 2001, in the face of the collapse of many ISPs as a possible result of the dot-com bust, Speakeasy had marketed a program to allow for simple transfer of accounts, starting with the announcement of the failure of Flashcom, a former DSL internet provider. That same year, the cybercafe burned down in an electrical fire, forcing the company to focus on the internet business.

In September 2003, Bruce Chatterley was made CEO of the company.

In summer of 2004, the company announced simultaneously their entry into VOIP, and their OneLink package, which allowed a DSL subscriber to maintain an ADSL line without the requirement of a traditional landline service.

In spring of 2006 Mike Apgar stepped down as chairman and moved on to a startup company Ookla that he created while at Speakeasy.

On March 27, 2007 press releases by both companies announced the acquisition of Speakeasy by Best Buy, a Fortune 100 retail chain operating in the US, Canada and China. Best Buy planned to offer Speakeasy broadband and VOIP services to small businesses through their Best Buy for Business unit.

On June 10, 2010 Best Buy announced it was reducing its stake in Speakeasy, which would be merging with Covad Communications and MegaPath Corporation to form a new joint company. On September 1, 2010, MegaPath, Covad, and Speakeasy announced regulatory approval and the completion of their merger. The new combined company took the name MegaPath Corporation.

On December 31, 2014, MegaPath Corporation sold certain of its network assets and direct internet access customers to GC Pivotal LLC dba Global Capacity, in order to raise cash to invest in its wholesale and managed services business.

On May 10, 2018, Fusion Connect announced they will acquire MegaPath. This acquisition has since closed.

== See also ==
- United States v. Ivanov – Notable cyber-law case. Ivanov intentionally hacked Speakeasy
