= Covad =

Defunct American communications provider

Covad Communications Company
- Type: Private company
- Industry: Telecommunications
- Founded: 1996; 30 years ago
- Defunct: 2010; 16 years ago
- Fate: Merged with Speakeasy into MegaPath
- Successor: MegaPath
- Headquarters: San Jose, California
- Key people: Pat Bennett, CEO
- Products: VOIP, DSL, T1, Wireless, Web Hosting
- Website: covad.com at the Wayback Machine (archived 2006-03-22)

Covad Communications Company, also known as Covad Communications Group, was an American provider of broadband voice and data communications. By Q3 2006, the company had 530,000 subscribers, and ranked as the 16th largest Internet service provider in the United States. Covad was acquired by U.S. Venture Partners, who in 2010 announced a three-way merger of MegaPath, Covad, and Speakeasy, creating a single Managed Services Local Exchange Carrier (MSLEC), providing voice and internet services; the new company was named MegaPath.

In January 2015, telecommunications service provider Global Capacity acquired MegaPath's wholesale and direct access business, which included assets acquired from Covad.

The name Covad was derived from acronyms which have varied over time, including COmbined Voice And Data, Copper Over Voice And Data, and in its earliest form, COpper Value ADded.

== History ==
Covad was the first service provider to offer a national DSL broadband service. In addition they offered Voice over IP, T1, Web hosting, managed security, IP and dial-up, and bundled voice and data services directly through Covad's network and through Internet service providers such as EarthLink and Speakeasy, value-added resellers, telecommunications carriers and affinity groups to businesses. Covad broadband services were available in 44 US states, including 235 Metropolitan Statistical Areas (MSAs), a services area available to over 50 percent of all businesses. The company was founded in San Jose, CA.

By 2008, Covad added the Samsung Acemap DSLAM to their portfolio on top of their pre-existing Nokia D50 DSLAMs, to allow for ADSL2+ technology, which can reach DSL speeds up to 15 Mbit/s. The launch of the AceMAP was primarily instigated to provide combined POTS and ADSL2+ service to EarthLink end users and were deployed in more residential areas instead of concentrating on business-centric markets.

Covad was acquired a by private equity firm, Platinum Equity, in April 2008. In 2010, it was sold to U.S. Venture Partners, which merged Covad, and Speakeasy into MegaPath.

The three-way merger produced an executive team comprising the former CEOs of all three former companies: Chairman and CEO (former MegaPath CEO) D. Craig Young, Chief Strategy Officer and Head of Wholesale Markets (former Covad CEO) Pat Bennett, and (former Speakeasy CEO) Bruce Chatterley as President of the Business Markets unit in charge of all non-wholesale customer sales, service and marketing.

In mid-2010, Covad announced Ethernet-over-Copper services in the Los Angeles market. The new Ethernet product ran over a Fujitsu Flashwave based Ethernet core and provided symmetrical speeds up to 20 Mbit/s. Ethernet over DS1 service was added soon after. In early 2011, Covad (now as Megapath) announced expansion of the services on a national level by the end of 2012.

In September 2014, Global Capacity announced its plan to buy the assets acquired from Covad from MegaPath. The acquisition was completed on January 1, 2015.
