= EllaLink =

Optical submarine cable

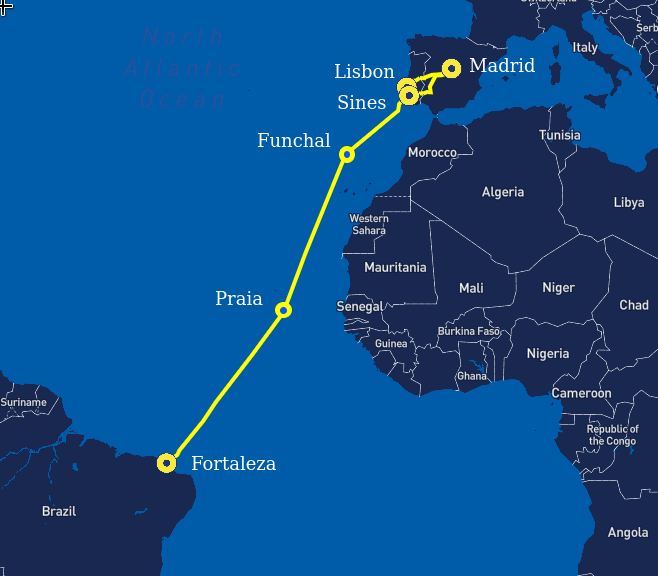
- Landing points: Sines (Portugal); Funchal (Portugal); Praia (Cabo Verde); Fortaleza (Brazil)
- Total length: Approx. 5,900 km between Sines (Portugal) and Fortaleza (Brazil)
- Topology: 4 fiber pairs
- Design capacity: 100 Tbit/s (4 fiber pairs)
- Technology: DWDM
- Date of first use: 1 June 2021
- Website: http://ella.link

EllaLink is an optical submarine cable linking the European and South American continents with landing points in Sines in Portugal and Fortaleza in Brazil. It has currently the lowest latency (<60 ms round-trip delay time between Portugal and Brazil) on the market.

For more than 20 years, there were no practical direct data transfer routes between Europe and South America. The only cable linking the two continents was Atlantis-2, which was not used for Internet data transfer due to its limited capacity.

One of the project's main goals was to circumvent the United States and its upstream collection as the route connects Europe directly with South America; this middleman position gave the US National Security Agency the ability to spy on European and South American communications. It was deemed problematic to EllaLink by interested parties. In that regard, then President of Brazil Dilma Rousseff said in 2014 that EllaLink would be central to "guarantee the neutrality" of the Internet, showing her wish to block Brazilian Internet traffic from being accessed for United States government activities.

The cable was launched 1 June 2021, providing a direct data route between Portugal and Brazil.

== Awards ==
EllaLink has received the following awards:

- 2022: European Broadband Award, Juri Award 2022 - The EllaLink project is a cross border international project offering high-capacity optical platform on a unique transatlantic route.
- 2020: Global Carrier Award in the category "Best Subsea Project of the Year".
- 2020: CC-Global Awards 2020: GCCM SPECIAL AWARD - Best Project of the Year, Subsea Networks.
- 2019: Global Carrier Award in the category "Subsea Networks - Project of the Year".

== History ==
As of March 2021

EllaLink was formed in 2012. The project began in 2015. In 2017, the supply contract was awarded to Alcatel Submarine Networks. The equity provider Marguerite became the sponsor in 2018.

Cable manufacture began in 2019; the installation of the cable started in December 2020. Two vessels (Ile de Brehat and Ile de Sein) were used to lay down the cable and its branching units. The installation of the cable was finished on 28 February 2021. The vessel Ile de Sein laid down the last universal cable joint linking together the Brazilian branch left by Ile de Brehat on 1 February 2021 and the European branch.
