= Blue-Raman cable system =

Proposed intercontinental fibre-optic cable system

The Blue-Raman cable system announced by Google in 2021, is an intercontinental fibre-optic communications cable connecting France to India and also connecting Italy, Greece, Israel, Jordan, Saudi Arabia, Djibouti, and Oman. The cable has a Mediterranean submarine segment named Blue, and an eastern submarine segment named Raman (after the famous Indian physicist C. V. Raman) which passes through the Red Sea and Arabian Sea. Both segments will fuse on-land, at an underground location north of the city of Aqaba. By connecting the Mediterranean to the Red Sea overland, the cable avoids passing through Egypt, a country widely regarded as a chokepoint for Internet connectivity. The cable consists of 16 fiber pairs implementing google's new space-division multiplexing (SDM) technology, providing a capacity of about 218 Tbit/s, but able to provide up to 400 Tbit/s in the future. This makes Blue-Raman the highest capacity cable linking Europe to Asia.

The Blue section of the cable has been completed, but following the gaza Israel war, construction of the Raman section has been put on hold.
