= Olivier Dunant =

Olivier Dunant LL.M

Treasurer of the World Scout Committee

Olivier P. Dunant, LL.M of Geneva, Switzerland was the appointed treasurer and one of 12 elected volunteer members of the World Scout Committee, the main executive body of the World Organization of the Scout Movement.

In 2016, it was announced that Joseph Lau had been selected to replace Dunant as the appointed treasurer and one of 12 elected volunteer members of the World Scout Committee, the main executive body of the World Organization of the Scout Movement; the WSC approved the appointment to fill that vacancy.

Dunant graduated from the University of Geneva in 1990 and New York University School of Law in 1995. He was admitted to the Swiss Bar in 1992.

Dunant was partner with Meyerlustenberger Lachenal, head of the legal services department of Ernst & Young in Geneva from 2001 to 2012, as well as law clerk at the Geneva Labor Dispute Court, before joining Eversheds. He specializes in corporate law and corporate governance, forensic work, fraud investigations and audit regulations. He teaches labor and employment law and immigration law at the Fédération des entreprises romandes (FER).

He joined the firm Meier Raetzo Dunant avocats in 2025.

Dunant is a member of the Association genevoise de droit des affaires (AGDA), the Association for Insolvency and Restructuring (Association LP), the Association of Insolvency Practitioners (INSOL Europe) as well as a board member of the Association of International Business Lawyers (AIBL), the Geneva Chamber of Commerce (CCIG) and the Swiss-American Chamber of Commerce (Lake Geneva Chapter). Dunant is chairman of the audit committee of CCI France-Suisse.

Dunant speaks French, English, and German.
