= TE North =

Submarine telecommunications cable system

TE North (Telecom Egypt North) is a submarine telecommunications cable linking France and Egypt developed by Alcatel-Lucent. The cable system is 3,100 km long with a capacity of up to 1.28 Tbit/s over 8 fibre pairs. The cable system expands the service footprint of the existing TE transit corridor by offering additional transit services in the Mediterranean. The cable was launched in 2010 and was later upgraded to use 40G channels in the summer of 2011, becoming the first cable in the Mediterranean to use this technology. The cable has landing points in:

1. Marseille, Bouches-du-Rhône, France
2. Abu Talat, Alexandria Governorate, Egypt
