= The International Stock Exchange =

Stock exchange operating in St. Peter Port, Guernsey

- TISE
- Type: Stock exchange
- Location: Saint Peter Port, Guernsey
- Founded: 20 December 2013
- Owner: The International Stock Exchange Group Limited
- Key people: Andreson Whammond (Non-Executive Chair); Cees Vermaas (CEO)
- Currency: GBP
- No. of listings: 4,200+
- Website: TISE

The International Stock Exchange (TISE) is a stock exchange headquartered in St. Peter Port, Guernsey. TISE provides a listing facility for international companies to raise capital from investors worldwide. It offers a regulated marketplace, with globally recognisable clients and a growing product range, from within the European time zone but outside the EU and UK.

== History ==
TISE was launched on 20 December 2013 as the Channel Islands Securities Exchange (CISE) when the Royal Court of Guernsey approved an arrangement for it to acquire the business of the Channel Islands Stock Exchange.

An office was opened in Jersey in February 2015.

In June 2016 the CISE listed its shares on its own exchange. The Channel Islands Securities Exchange Authority Limited 2,461,000 ordinary shares have a limited market at present.

December 2016 saw a world-first with a listing on CISE of a global bitcoin fund.

February 2017 saw an announcement that the exchange would rebrand as "The International Stock Exchange". The rules of the exchange having been recently changed to allow listing sponsors to be based in places other than in the Channel Islands. In March 2017 the rebranding was completed and an office was opened in the Isle of Man.

== Licensing ==
TISE is the trading name of The International Stock Exchange Group Limited. It wholly owns The Channel Islands Securities Exchange Authority Limited, trading as The International Stock Exchange Authority (TISEA), which is licensed to operate an investment exchange under The Protection of Investors (Bailiwick of Guernsey) Law, 1987, as amended, by the Guernsey Financial Services Commission.

== Jurisdictional offices ==
- Guernsey
- Isle of Man
- Jersey

== Listings ==
The exchange lists a wide range of securities:

- Primary and secondary listings of securities issued by Guernsey, Jersey and overseas trading companies
- Investment vehicles, including open and closed ended funds and Real Estate Investment Trusts (REITs)
- Specialist debt securities for sophisticated investors, including the use of Special Purpose Vehicles (SPVs) and the Quoted Eurobond Exemption for convertible bonds, intra-group financing, structured products and warrants
- There are specific rules for equities and corporate debt securities issued by extractive industries
- Special Purpose Acquisition Companies (SPACs) were introduced in November 2015

== Private marketing ==
TISE offers private, unlisted companies a method to trade shares through their 'TISE Private Markets' service, with electronic auction trading, settlement, and registry management.

== International recognition ==
Recognition of the TISE:

- The UK HMRC deem the Exchange a Recognised Stock Exchange under Section 1005 of the Income Tax Act 2007.
- The Exchange is approved as an Affiliate Member of the International Organization of Securities Commissions IOSCO.
- The Exchange is officially recognised by the Australian Securities Exchange ASX.
- The Exchange is an Affiliate Member of the World Federation of Exchanges WFE.
- The U.S. Securities and Exchange Commission recognise the TISE as a Designated Offshore Securities Market.
- The German Federal Financial Supervisory Authority recognise TISE as an Approved Stock Exchange.

== See also ==
- List of stock exchanges in the United Kingdom, the British Crown Dependencies and United Kingdom Overseas Territories
