= EXA Infrastructure =

Network connecting Europe and North America

- Industry: Digital infrastructure
- Founded: 2021
- Headquarters: London, United Kingdom
- Key people: Jim Fagan (CEO), Nick Read (Chairman)
- Website: exainfra.net

EXA Infrastructure is a company based in London which operates digital network infrastructure and a cable network connecting Europe and North America owning over 170,000 km of fibre network in 37 countries. It owns and manages extensive terrestrial and subsea fibre networks, including EXA Express, Dunant, Havfrue, Amitie, and expanded its subsea portfolio through the acquisition of Aqua Comms. It was established in the 2000s as part of joint projects by Hibernia Networks, Interoute and KPN.

== History ==
In 2000, the building of the network started both in Europe and across the Atlantic. It was followed by the opening of BARI Cable Landing Station for OTE in 2003.

In 2004, EXA acquired the CECOM Network in the Czech Republic. In 2005, the network was expanded in the US and EU. In 2006, the network extended to Halifax, Boston, New York, Chicago, and Montreal. In 2007, EXA's network was expanded with the addition of Warsaw and the installation of a subsea cable from Malta to Sicily in 2008. In 2009, the network was built in Hungary, Romania, and Bulgaria. The project Kelvin, expanding the network in Northern Ireland, followed in 2010, along with the building to Istanbul. In 2011, EXA's network was expanded with a subsea cable landing from Tunisia to Sicily. The following year, the Bezeq submarine cable was landed in Bari. In 2015, EXA Infrastructure introduced EXA Infrastructure Express with the lowest latency connection between the UK and the US.

In 2018, Sofia-Belgrade-Budapest was built, and in 2019, KPN was acquired, expanding routes in the UK and Netherlands. On September 17, 2021, EXA was established in London by I Squared Capital. The company emerged from the infrastructure assets carved out from GTT (Interoute/Hibernia) which had been developed since the 2000s.

In 2022, EXA Infrastructure extended its subsea and terrestrial fibre/duct infrastructure across Italy, Greece, Albania, Bulgaria, Turkey, France, Spain, and Portugal. In 2023, EXA Infrastructure added three new transatlantic cables to its network, named Dunant, Havfrue, and Amitie.

In 2024, Exa Infrastructure agreed with Telecom Egypt to extend its network from Europe to Egypt. To strengthen its European and transatlantic footprint, EXA Infrastructure has made key acquisitions and launched new services in 2024:

The acquisition of GCN enhanced EXA’s European terrestrial network in Bulgaria.

The launch of EXA Financial Network (EFN) introduced a specialised infrastructure platform designed for financial exchanges, providing ultra-low-latency connectivity across North America and Europe.

The Managed Fibre Network (MFN) service allows enterprises to scale quickly with a fully managed fibre model, reducing the complexities of network ownership.

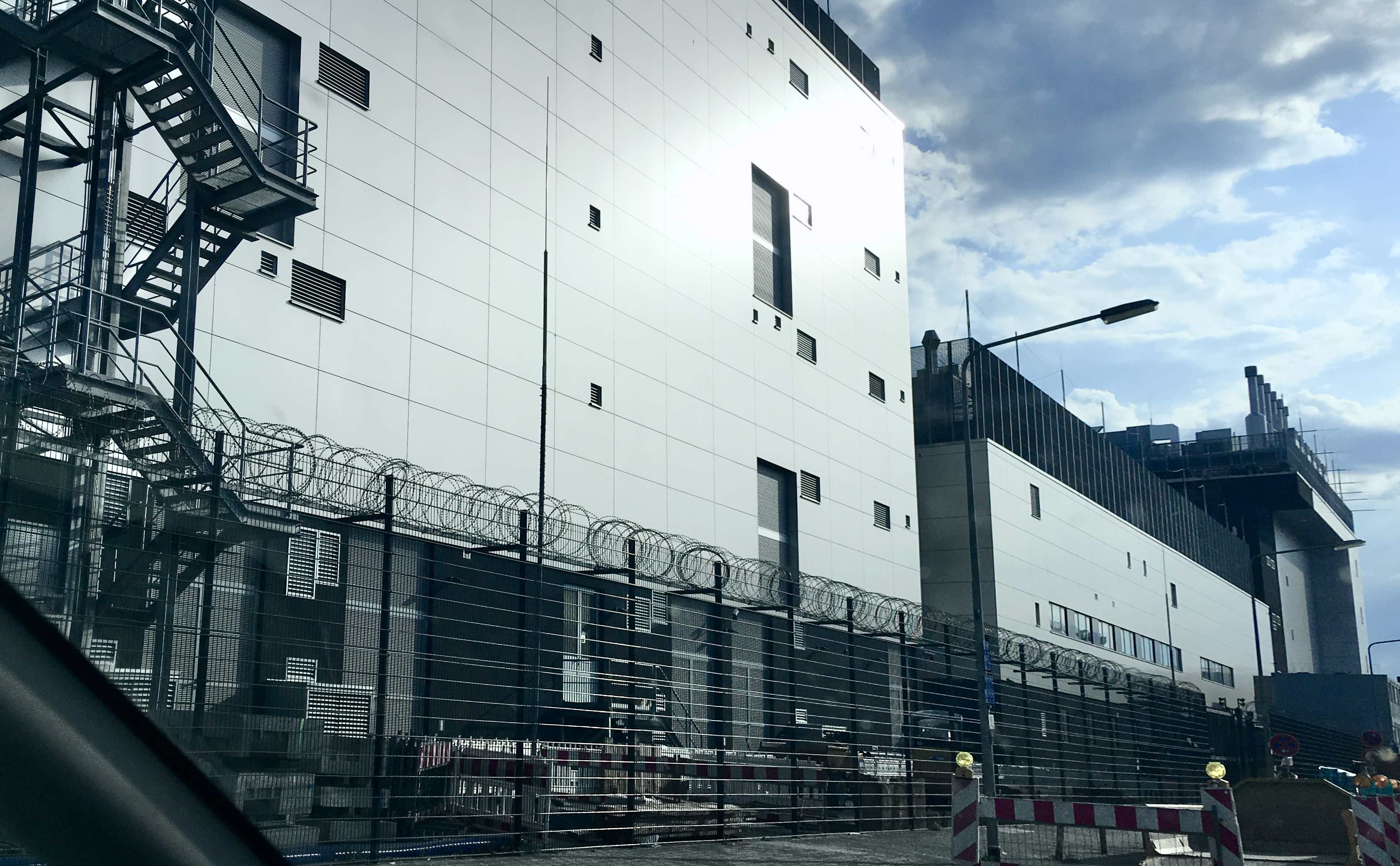
Data centre in Frankfurt, Germany

In 2025, EXA Infrastructure expanded its European network through several strategic projects and investments. In February, the company was selected by IOEMA as the UK landing partner for a new subsea cable system in Leiston, Suffolk, providing landing facilities and backhaul links to major London data centres.

In March 2025, EXA partnered with Ultranet to build a new 175-kilometre fibre route between Genoa and Milan, enhancing network resilience and diversity in northern Italy.

By mid-2025, EXA completed a 1,200-kilometre high-capacity fibre route connecting London, Frankfurt, Amsterdam and Brussels, including subsea segments optimised for low latency.

In September 2025, the company announced Project Visegrád, one of Central Europe’s largest cross-border fibre-backbone builds in decades, linking Poland, Czechia, Slovakia and Hungary to EXA’s German and Austrian backbone.

In October 2025, EXA finalised a €1.3 billion refinancing to support long-term network expansion, and completed a major upgrade to the Paris–Marseille corridor by introducing a geographically diverse Paris–Dijon–Marseille route. Later that month, EXA agreed to acquire long-haul duct infrastructure from Conexio doo Beograd, expanding its footprint in the Balkans.

On 31 December 2025, EXA Infrastructure completed the acquisition of Aqua Comms, a subsea cable operator specialising in transatlantic connectivity. The acquisition expanded EXA Infrastructure’s subsea portfolio and reinforced its presence in the North Atlantic region.

In April 2026, EXA Infrastructure completed the acquisition of long-haul duct infrastructure from Conexio doo Beograd, further expanding its footprint in the Balkans.

In September 2026 EXA Infrastructure announced EXA Meridian, a new 6,552 km transatlantic subsea cable between New Jersey, U.S., and Brean, UK. Scheduled to be ready for service in 2029, EXA Meridian will become the ninth transatlantic cable in EXA Infrastructure’s portfolio, adding significant new capacity and route diversity between North America and Europe, two of the world’s largest digital markets.

== Activities ==
EXA Infrastructure operates primarily in Europe, trans-Atlantic, and East Coast North America, focusing on infrastructure, transport, colocation, and technical services. Jim Fagan is the CEO since August 2024, and Nick Read (former Vodafone CEO) is chair of EXA's board of directors.
