= Channel Islands Stock Exchange =

Stock exchange based in Guernsey

- Type: Stock Exchange
- Location: St. Peter Port, Channel Islands
- Founded: October 1998
- Currency: GBP
- Website: www.cisx.com
- CISX Closed 2013

The Channel Islands Stock Exchange (CISX) was a stock exchange operating in St. Peter Port, Guernsey, the business of which was acquired by the Channel Islands Securities Exchange on 20 December 2013.

It was founded in March 1998, as a company limited both by guarantee and by shares. It was an offshore stock exchange in the European time zone for the listing of investment funds, debt instruments and the shares of companies.

It provided listing facility and screen-based trading for local and international trading companies, investment companies - both open- and closed-ended funds - Channel Islands depository receipts (CIDRS) and specialist debt securities, including Eurobonds, Structured Debt, Warrants and SPVs.

The CISX closed down in December 2013 and all business was moved into the newly formed Channel Islands Securities Exchange rebranded in 2017 as The International Stock Exchange.

== See also ==
- List of stock exchanges in the United Kingdom, the British Crown Dependencies and United Kingdom Overseas Territories
