= Common Information Sharing Environment =

EU initiative

The Common Information Sharing Environment (CISE) is a European Union initiative that provides a decentralised framework for information exchange across sectors and is made up of more than 300 EU and national authorities responsible for maritime surveillance. The primary objective of CISE is to ensure maritime situational awareness leading to a quick response from national agencies in the event of crises, threats, emergencies, and other risky occurrences at sea. The initiative is currently in the transitional phase before entering into force.

== Overview ==
The objective of establishing compatibility between EU and national marine monitoring systems is an integral part of maritime security. Recent developments and a steady increase in maritime threats reveal the need for enhancing maritime domain awareness, significantly strengthening surveillance on coastal and offshore territory, as well as reinforcing the CISE to facilitate secure information exchange among national and EU authorities. However, the newly developed maritime security strategy is not a new phenomenon and is somewhat overdue; calls to increase surveillance and information sharing in the maritime sector were already made more than a decade ago. States need to ensure access to vital information to safeguard maritime security, enabling them to take proactive or reactive measures. Much hope to improve the status quo on maritime security is placed into CISE, as it aims to make different systems interoperable and, therefore, enable and simplify data sharing among members of the EU and EEA. The relevant authorities of member states undertake a range of operational surveillance tasks across different domains: including maritime safety, security, prevention of pollution by ships, fisheries control, marine pollution preparedness and response, marine environment, customs, border control, general law enforcement, and defence. The CISE initiative will facilitate rapid and secure access to critical information, thereby enhancing the effectiveness and cost-efficiency of surveillance activities in the maritime sector. The key characteristics of CISE are:

- it is a voluntary collaborative process to enhance and promote information exchange between authorities involved in maritime surveillance;
- it aims to provide a decentralised framework for operating and exchanging important information;
- it intends to bring added value to existing maritime data systems, services, and sharing processes;
- its implementation should not affect the administrative structures of member states or existing EU legislation

== History ==
The development of CISE began in 2009 and has undergone continuous refinement since then. An important milestone in the roadmap of CISE was the EUCISE2020 project, which ran from 2014 to 2018 and promised to deliver an operational solution for designing the architecture for an open information exchange. The European security research project, EUCISE 2020, was a significant achievement for CISE, involving 40 partners from 16 EU/EEA coastal countries, enabling the development and testing of its network based on existing surveillance systems as well as networks. As of 2019, CISE is in a transitional phase, managed by the European Maritime Safety Agency (EMSA), with participation from most member states and EU agencies and support from the Joint Research Centre (JRC). The Commission oversees the process and encourages participation from all member states. In the last stakeholder meeting, the transitional phase has been extended to December 2023.

== Costs ==
An impact assessment document by the European Commission in 2014 provided estimated total costs for the implementation of CISE. Over ten years, the project will cost €133 million, €26 million for the EU, and €107 million shared by all member states. However, the costs of implementing CISE depend on various factors, such as how each member state chooses to organise its information sharing, the number of information services provided, and the range of existing and planned IT systems. It is unknown whether the costs have increased or remained the same since the last calculation.

== Weaknesses ==
The CISE network will not function smoothly without tremendous efforts by all member states; numerous technicalities and operational structures are yet to be developed, but it is a promising start to surveilling and protecting critical maritime infrastructure. Other weaknesses include its incapability to exchange classified information due to an organisational constraint of maritime authorities which may consequently restrict collaboration between stakeholders. The cyber information exchange within CISE is also unclear, including which data model and information types will be used for sharing.

== Transitional Phase ==
The primary objective of the transitional phase is to convert the results of the EUCISE 2020 research project into an operational network for exchanging maritime surveillance information. Moreover, the member states are assisted in incorporating the interoperability of building blocks into their systems to ensure coherence with the overall European maritime surveillance framework and maritime information systems. The transitional phase is coordinated by the EMSA and supported by the JRC. The participation in the transitional phase is open to all member states.
