= AEConnect =

Submarine communications cable

- Owners: Aqua Comms
- Landing points: 1. Shirley, New York United States; 2. (Republic of Ireland) Killala, Ireland
- Total length: 5536 km
- Design capacity: 130 wavelengths x 100 Gbit/s per fiber pair = 13 Tbit/s
- Technology: Fiber optics

AEConnect (AEC-1) is a submarine communications cable privately owned by Aqua Comms linking the United States and Ireland. The cable has extended connectivity via the CeltixConnect cable to London. Originally the cable project was called Emerald Express managed by Emerald Networks, and was intended to include a cable landing in Iceland, however after being unable to secure funding the project ownership was transferred to the current owner.

The cable began construction in April 2015. The cable spans 5536 km between landing stations in Shirley, USA and Killala, Ireland. The cable's final splice was made in November 2015 and was declared to be ready for service in January 2016
