= Network as a service =

Provision of computer networking technology to an organization

Network as a service (NaaS) is a term used to describe the provision of computer networking technology to an organisation as an integrated service. It is related to terms like infrastructure as a service (IaaS), platform as a service (PaaS), software as a service (SaaS), and software-defined networking (SDN).

Historic definitions focused on fundamental concepts of NaaS, including describing services for network transport connectivity. NaaS also involves the optimization of resource allocations by considering network and computing resources as a unified whole.

== Description ==
With cloud computing, NaaS is one of the transports between dynamic collaborators outside of the cloud (an update to the classic enterprise WAN architecture) and between enterprise resources in private, often multi-tenant, data center (MTDC) facilities and in the public Cloud Service Providers (CSPs), including the interconnection between all of these in a "cloud first" enterprise architecture.

Before the new WAN connectivity patterns, enterprise WAN architectures, and consumption models resulting from the adoption of cloud computing and the network programmability focus introduced by SDN, NaaS was sometimes used to describe more traditional network resource-sharing concepts like the provision of a virtual network service by the owners of the network infrastructure to a third party.

Some service models include:

- Connectivity cloud: A model in which a private fiber fabric or wireline "middle mile" network is used to bypass often less-optimal public (internet) routing and congestion to provide connectivity for critical Enterprise resources and services access. Controlled via a distributed software platform, the model supports "cloud-aligned" elastic consumption including on-demand provisioning, any-to-any connectivity, and flexible bandwidth deployment (see BoD) through both portal and programmable API operation and introspection. By integrating the platform API with provisioning and application deployment playbooks, the resulting WAN can realize an infrastructure as code paradigm for wide area networks—"network-as-code". The resulting services include custom WAN inter-connectivity, hybrid cloud and multi-cloud connectivity. This model is employed by a facility-based provider, and is not reliant on another network as an underlay (like VPN or IP transit-based network models). While the operations design is direct-to-consumer, because of its programmability and its facilities base, this model can also support the Virtual Network Operator model for wireline connectivity in a manner similar to the mobile network virtualization model (MVNO) for wireless networks.
- Connecting through the cloud: It is considered that 2 or more locations/systems are connected through the cloud when they use the service provided by the cloud - Network as a Service. The equipment that builds the cloud network services (switch, router, firewall, border leaf, etc.) is responsible for this connection. It is not even necessary to use the IaaS service to have 2 or more locations connected in the cloud.
- Virtual private network (VPN): A tunnel overlay that extends a private network and the resources contained in the network across networks like the public Internet. It enables a host computer to send and receive data across shared or public networks as if it were a public network with the functionality and policies of the private network.
- Virtual network operation: A model common in mobile networks in which a telecommunications manufacturer or independent network operator builds and operates a network (wireless or transport connectivity) and sells its communication access capabilities to third parties, commonly mobile phone operators, charging by capacity utilization. A mobile virtual network operator (MVNO) is a mobile communications services provider that does not own the radio spectrum or wireless network infrastructure over which it provides services. Commonly a MVNO offers its communication services using the network infrastructure of an established mobile network operator.
- Non-internet connectivity can also be managed and controlled through a NaaS, such as booking time on satellite transponders for international television connections. While the reservation is made through a web page or API on the internet, the actual satellite connection might use an MPEG Transport Stream with no IP layer at all.

== See also ==
- as a service
