= Dunant (submarine communications cable) =

Transatlantic communications cable connecting the US to France

Dunant is a private 250 Tbit/s 6,600 kilometre transatlantic communications cable that connects the United States (Virginia Beach) with France (Saint-Hilaire-de-Riez). Named for Henry Dunant, it was announced by Google in 2018 and went live in 2020.

== History ==
In July 2018, Google announced that it would be investing in two private subsea cables - Dunant and Curie - both of which were named after Nobel prize winners. Google claimed that it was the first "non-telecoms" company to build subsea cables with its investment in these two. Dunant is the first new subsea cable between the US and France in 15 years and will have landing stations at Virginia Beach (US) and Saint-Hilaire-de-Riez (France). Telecoms industry analysts have stated that the main purpose of Google's subsea cable investment is twofold: to support quality of service and reduce costs.

Google subsequently commissioned TE Subcom, a TE Connectivity company, to lay the cable which will use a high fibre count (HFC) architecture, with 12 fibre-pairs and space division multiplexing (SDM). The design capacity is 250 terabits per second (Tbit/s).

In October 2018, Orange announced it would collaborate with Google on the Dunant cable, acting as the French landing partner - building and operating the landing station on the French Atlantic coast and providing the backhaul service to Paris.

In February 2020, Orange announced it was partnering with Telxius, Telefónica's infrastructure company, to collaborate in Europe and the US on backhaul extensions for the Dunant cable.

On the 13th of March 2020, Orange landed the cable in Saint-Hilaire-de-Riez.

The cable went live in September 2020. In 2023, EXA Infrastructure added Dunant to its transatlantic subsea cable route network connecting USA and Europe.

== See also ==
- Dark fibre
- Submarine communications cable
- Transatlantic communications cable
