= Find me/follow me =

Find Me/Follow Me refers to two technologies that, in conjunction, enable incoming phone calls to be received at different locations, on different phones.

“Find Me” refers to the ability to receive incoming calls at any location. “Follow Me” refers to the ability to receive calls at any number of designated phones, whether ringing all at once, or in sequence.

In some systems, the user is assigned a virtual phone number. When that number is dialed, the system routes the call through a user-defined list of numbers. The numbers may be called simultaneously or sequentially, either in a preferred order or in accordance with the user's scheduled activities and locations. If no connection is made once all numbers on the list have been called, the system may give up or route the call to voice mail.

Examples

Multiple phones ringing at once: A caller dials your virtual phone number. Simultaneously, your cell phone, home phone, and office phone all ring at the same time.

Sequential phones ringing: A caller dials your virtual phone number. Your home phone rings first, your cell next, then your home office phone. If there is no answer on any phone, the caller can leave a voice mail message.
