= Dynamic/Dialup Users List =

A Dial-up/Dynamic User List (DUL) is a type of DNSBL which contains the IP addresses an ISP assigns to its customer on a temporary basis, often using DHCP or similar protocols. Dynamically assigned IP addresses are contrasted with static IP addresses which do not change once they have been allocated by the service provider.

DULs serve several purposes. Their primary function is to assist an ISP in enforcement of its Acceptable Use Policy, many of which prohibit customers from setting up an email server. Customers are expected to use the email facilities of the service provider. This use of a DUL is especially helpful in curtailing abuse when a customer's computer has been converted into a zombie computer and is distributing email without the knowledge of the computer's owner. A second major use involves receivers who do not wish to accept email from computers with dynamically assigned email addresses. They use DULs to enforce this policy. Receivers adopt such policies because computers at dynamically assigned IP addresses so often are a source of spam.

The first DUL was created by Gordon Fecyk in 1998. It quickly became quite popular because it addressed a specific tactic popular with spammers at the time. The DUL subsequently was absorbed by Mail Abuse Prevention System (MAPS) in 1999. When MAPS was no longer a free service, other DNSBLs such as Dynablock, Not Just Another Bogus List (NJABL), and Spam and Open Relay Blocking System (SORBS) began providing lists of dynamically assigned IP addresses.
