= David Rowe =

David or Dave Rowe may refer to:

== Academics ==
- David Rowe (sociologist), professor emeritus at Western Sydney University
- David C. Rowe (1949–2003), American psychologist
- David E. Rowe (born 1950), American mathematician and historian
- David M. Rowe (born 1960), American political scientist

== Business and technology ==
- David Rowe (entrepreneur) (born 1958), British entrepreneur
- David Rowe (executive), director of the University of Warwick Science Park Ltd, West Midlands

== Sports ==
- Dave Rowe (baseball) (1854–1930), baseball player
- Dave Rowe (American football) (born 1945), American football player
- David Rowe (cyclist) (born 1944), British 1972 Olympic cyclist
- David Rowe (tennis), Australian tennis player, see 1946 Australian Championships – Men's Singles

== Other ==
- David Rowe-Beddoe, Baron Rowe-Beddoe (1937–2023), British politician
- David H. Rowe (born 1991), American politician from Pennsylvania
- David P. Rowe (1959–2018), Jamaican-American lawyer
- Dave Rowe (musician) (born 1973), American folk singer from Maine
- David Rowe (cartoonist), Australian political cartoonist
