= UK Online =

Internet service provider

- Company type: Internet service provider
- Industry: Internet
- Founded: 1994; 32 years ago
- Defunct: 2011
- Fate: Acquired by Easynet
- Headquarters: United Kingdom
- Area served: United Kingdom
- Key people: Chris Stening
- Products: Internet service
- Parent: British Sky Broadcasting
- Website: ukonline.net

UK Online was a consumer Internet service provider that operated within the UK, and began as a dial-up provider in 1994. Network provider Easynet acquired the company in 1996, and were in turn acquired by BSkyB in 2005. The service was closed down in January 2011.

Initially launching an ADSL based broadband product in November 2004 with a 1MB service, they did not appear to be offering anything out of the ordinary. However, they quickly followed up by launching one of the UK's first consumer 8MB services in the same month. At the initial price of £39.99 a month, the service caused quite a stir in the UK broadband market. The 8MB service was only available in areas served by the parent company Easynet's LLU operations. Areas not covered were offered traditional speed products based on BT wholesale products. Along with planned speed upgrades by cable supplier Telewest, the UK Online 8MB service helped spur a series of investments by other ISPs in the UK in an effort to keep up.

In October 2007 UK Online provided three packages, Lite, Pro, and Premier - all with "unlimited" usage limits. However, a Fair Usage Policy applied to all packages and heavy users were moved onto so called "bad boy pipes" (although this did not appear to happen with LLU connections).

Since the regulatory approval of ADSL2+ technology in the UK, UK Online were able to offer services with speeds up to 22MB, and were one of the first companies to do so on a national scale. This was still based on the Easynet LLU coverage however.

In October 2005 BSkyB purchased Easynet and so now also owned UK Online, however UK Online continued to exist as a separate entity from Sky Broadband. In January 2008 Easynet Connect was launched as a SME ISP by UK Online and Easynet.

In spring 2008 UK Online announced it would shortly be launching a number of competitive new services, including domain registration, Microsoft Hosted Exchange email and commercial web hosting on Windows and Linux. The development of the planned services was cancelled and all mention of them, including the pre-registration page, quietly dropped from the website in May/June 2008.

In September 2009 the online ordering system started displaying a message of "We are unable to confirm some information about your current connection and cannot process your signup online at this time. You can still sign up for UK Online by calling us directly on 0800 053 2222". However, on ringing up, customers were told the ordering systems were being updated, and orders could not be placed.

In November 2010, UK Online announced on its home page that Sky was closing it down, with all UK Online services due to end on 21 January 2011.

By February 2011, the UK Online website stated simply "UK Online is now closed". However, there were problems with the company closure and a number of customers reported that their phone lines still had ADSL activated on them with the consequence that they could not migrate to another ISP despite the fact that they no longer received any service from either UK Online or Sky.
