= Spam Prevention Early Warning System =

Former online anti-spam blocklist service

The Spam Prevention Early Warning System (SPEWS) was an anonymous, volunteer-operated service that maintained a list of IP address ranges belonging to internet service providers (ISPs) that hosted spammers, were considered spam-friendly, or hosted websites advertised in spam. Internet sites could query the list and use it as an additional source of information when deciding whether to block or filter incoming email.

Unlike blocklists that targeted only individual offending addresses, SPEWS deliberately listed wide blocks of address space around a spam source. Such approach was trying to influence internet providers to take action against spammers. Due to anonymity of SPEWS operators and no formal process to appeal their listing, the service was both influential and raised legal concerns; a Florida attorney who sued its operators called them "vigilantes of the Internet".

For a time, the list was distributed through Joe Jared's Osirusoft service. In August 2003, after months of distributed denial-of-service (DDoS) attacks, Jared closed Osirusoft, although mirror sites kept SPEWS available. The SPEWS database was last updated on 24 August 2006, after which the resource dnsbl.com listed its status as dead. It was succeeded by the service called the Anonymous Postmaster Early Warning System (APEWS) in January 2007.

== Operation ==
SPEWS distributed its data as a DNS-based blocklist, so a mail server could check a sending address with an ordinary Domain Name System query during an incoming SMTP connection. A listing typically began with the addresses directly tied to spam senders, and could be widened to a larger surrounding range. This range was intended for influencing scoring filters rather than straight blocking. However, this approach sometimes resulted in blocking mail from users who were not tied to spam distribution, and there was no formal way to appeal the listing on SPEWS.

== Reception and disputes ==
Critics argued that preemptive listing of large address netblocks was affecting regular users, while supporters said SPEWS was forcing providers to filter spammers on their networks.

=== Legal actions ===
In June 2002, SPEWS listed the range of addresses belonging to the Australian direct-marketing business T3 Direct, run by Wayne Mansfield, together with its ISP. This forced the provider to suspend the company's access. Mansfield sued Perth anti-spam campaigner Joey McNicol, alleging that McNicol had reported the company's address to SPEWS. The case was dismissed in October 2002, after Mansfield could not prove that McNicol had contacted the service.

In April 2003, EMarketersAmerica.org, a Florida non-profit corporation represented by attorney Mark Felstein, sued several anti-spam organizations, including SPEWS, The Spamhaus Project and SpamCop, along with nine associated individuals, alleging restraint of trade and interference with their members' contracts. Anti-spam activists widely viewed the suit as a SLAPP and as an attempt to identify the anonymous operators of SPEWS. The plaintiff later moved to drop the action, and in October 2003 U.S. District Judge Donald M. Middlebrooks dismissed it with prejudice, although the defendants still had to cover their own legal costs.

=== Telewest listing ===
In May 2005, SPEWS listed a large amount of address space belonging to the British cable operator Telewest, affecting around 900,000 of its Blueyonder broadband customers after many of their computers were hijacked to send spam. Telewest said it was contacting affected customers to help clean up infected PCs and was preparing a software security update and further network protections. The company insisted that customer emails with no relation to spam were being blocked.

== Denial-of-service attacks and shutdown ==
From the summer of 2003, several anti-spam blocklists, including SpamCop, Spamhaus and SPEWS, were intermittently knocked offline by DDoS attacks launched in part from networks of compromised "zombie" computers. Joe Jared, who hosted SPEWS data at Osirusoft, said he was hit with floods of up to around a gigabyte of data per second and closed the service in late August 2003. As Osirusoft was shut down, it briefly returned a match for every queried address, which caused mail servers that relied on it to reject all incoming email until administrators reconfigured them. The same wave of attacks forced the closure of other lists, including Ron Guilmette's Monkeys.com. SPEWS itself remained reachable through mirror sites and continued to be updated for several more years.

== Successor ==
The SPEWS database hasn't been updated since August 24, 2006. A successor service named the Anonymous Postmaster Early Warning System (APEWS) appeared shortly after in January 2007, using similar listing criteria and a closely matching website maintained by anonymous operators.

== See also ==
- News.admin.net-abuse.email (NANAE)
- The Spamhaus Project
- DNSBL
