= Easynet Connect =

British Internet service provider

- Type: Network provider
- Industry: Internet
- Founded: 1994 as Easynet; 2008 as Easynet Connect
- Fate: Acquired by Interoute
- Headquarters: UK
- Area served: UK
- Parent: Easynet

Easynet Connect was a UK-based Internet service provider. The Easynet Connect brand was founded on 7 January 2008 to focus on small-to-medium size companies with 11-249 employees. Easynet Connect’s core focus was as a business ISP, providing Internet access connectivity, colocation services and hybrid cloud computing services to small businesses and resellers in the UK. It was headquartered in London, with customer service and hosting centres in London and Somerset.

Easynet Connect was the sister company of Easynet Global Services, a network, hosting and cloud integration business servicing enterprises. Easynet (including Easynet Connect) was acquired by British Sky Broadcasting in 2006. On 21 July 2010, British Sky Broadcasting reached an agreement over the proposed sale of Easynet Global Services, to Lloyds Development Capital (LDC), a leading UK private equity company fully funded by the Lloyds Banking Group.

On 21 July 2010, British Sky Broadcasting reached an agreement over the proposed sale of the Easynet brand and customer base to Lloyds Development Capital (LDC), a leading UK private equity company fully funded by the Lloyds Banking Group.

In December 2013 the company was acquired by MDNX Group, one of the UK's largest independent carrier integrators. Both Easynet Global Services and Easynet Connect were combined with MDNX existing brands to form a single organisation which traded as Easynet. The acquisition was backed by Equistone Partners Europe Limited, one of Europe’s leading mid-market private equity managers, who held a majority stake in the newly formed group.

In October 2015 the Easynet Group of companies was acquired by Interoute for £402 million.

== Network ==
Easynet marketed local loop unbundling (LLU) in the UK in 2001, and was the first to challenge BT in the wholesale broadband market when it announced its 8 Mbit/s service in 2004. The company claimed the 2nd largest core network in the UK (6,030 km of fibre in 2009), while the majority of its services are delivered via copper connections in the last mile.

Easynet marketed bonded DSL in the UK and was the first UK ISP to offer bonded FTTC (also known as VDSL) which it markets as EtherStream V. Country-wide coverage of EtherStream V is currently limited to areas where FTTC is available but can deliver broadband speeds of up to 320 Mbit/s downstream and up to 80 Mbit/s upstream.
