= Public Services Network =

UK government high-performance network

Public Services Network (PSN)
- Type: data and voice
- Location: United Kingdom
- Protocols: IP
- Operator: Government Digital Service (part of UK government Cabinet Office)
- Established: 2008
- Current status: operational
- Commercial?: No
- Website: gov.uk/government/groups/public-services-network

The Public Services Network (PSN) is a UK government's high-performance network, which helps public sector organisations work together, reduce duplication and share resources. It unified the provision of network infrastructure across the United Kingdom public sector into an interconnected "network of networks" to increase efficiency and reduce overall public expenditure. It is now a legacy network and public sector organisations are being migrated to using services on the public internet.

== Origins ==
The Public Services Network (PSN) was launched officially as part of the Transformational Government Strategy commencing in 2005, under the original name of the Public Sector Network.

Prior to this, some parts of local government had already successfully implemented the concept. The Hampshire Public Services Network (HPSN) was the first PSN, launched in 1999, followed closely by Kent County Councils partnerships with the KPSN. The HPSN, encompassing all of the borough, district and unitary councils, with the County Council, as well as the Fire Services, the Isle of Wight Council and 540 schools. National PSN technical and architecture compliance criteria were established from 2007, by GDS working with local government leaders from Socitm (the Society of Information Technology Management) on the National CIO Council and the Local CIO Council.

The PSN's aim was to bring public services organisations with a common interest onto a single, coherent and standards-based ‘network of networks’. This would create influence, economies of scale and a commonality of standards for secure and easy inter-connection between public service organisations.

The original concept of a network of networks strategy was based upon the work already undertaken in local government and recognition of Communities of Interest (COI) within the Criminal Justice Sector during work by the Office for Criminal Justice Reform (OCJR) between 2005 and 2007 to enable data sharing across business units.

In this context a COI was defined as groups of Government departments and external partners who in combination provided services within a specific area of operation and used the same data, with a similar risk profile, shared risk appetite and common governance framework. Historically each group member had implemented their own networks and standards of operation in isolation with little or no consideration as to how services and data may be shared and resulting in increased costs of operation.

The Network of Networks strategy proposed within OCJR recommended the creation of specific networks based upon these Communities of Interest which were joined together through data interchange gateways supporting common standards. Under this approach networks would be arranged by data type and business functions such as Criminal Justice, Health and Social Care, Defence and Intelligence or Public Finance rather than solely on established departmental boundaries. Within a COI, trust relationships and data interchange are readily supported, enabling data sharing without a need to cross network boundaries and providing benefits of scale without the challenges and compromises intrinsic to homogeneous cross sector networks. Data is made available without a need to transport it between organisations and control is retained by the data originator.

In early 2007 a group of UK Government department CTOs in conjunction with the Office for Government Commerce Buying Solutions (OGC BS) established the vision for a single commonly provided, procured and managed public sector voice and data network infrastructure to replace the multitude of separately procured and managed networks serving various segments of the UK public sector; Education, Health, Central Government, Local Government etc.

In 2008 an Industry Working Group was established to document the objectives and requirements more clearly. Their report set out the architectural and commercial principles as well as anticipated security, service management, governance and transition arrangements.

== Architecture ==
The PSN comprises a core network, the Government Conveyancing Network or GCN provided by GCN Service Providers or GCNSPs. The GCN interconnects multiple operator networks, termed Direct Network Service Providers or DNSPs. Subscriber organisations contract to a connection from a local participating DNSP, connect via that to GCN and hence onwards to other interconnected networks and services. The GCN network is entirely based on IPv4 and MPLS and the GCNSPs are not currently mandated to provide IPv6, though they should have a roadmap to implementing it if and when required.

== Commercial framework ==
In 2010 Virgin Media Business, BT, Cable & Wireless and Global Crossing signed Deeds of Undertaking (DoU) and subsequently achieved accreditation for providing GCN and IP VPN services.

In March 2012, BT, Cable & Wireless, Capita Business Services, Eircom, Fujitsu, Kcom, Level 3, Logicalis, MDNX, Thales, Updata and Virgin Media Business were successful bidders for the initial two-year PSN Connectivity framework.

In June 2012, 29 companies were confirmed as suppliers of ICT services to the UK public sector under the Government's PSN Services framework contract. Apart from most of the previous suppliers, additional companies also included 2e2, Airwave Solutions, Azzurri Communications, Cassidian, CSC Computer Sciences, Computacenter, Daisy Communications, Easynet Global Services, EE, Freedom Communications, Icom Holdings, NextiraOne, PageOne Communications, Phoenix IT Group, Siemens Communications, Specialist Computer Centres, Telefónica, telent Technology Services, Uniworld Communications and Vodafone.

== Governance ==
The PSN is managed within the Cabinet Office where it is part of the Government Digital Service.

== Early implementations ==
There were already notable initiatives in progress in county council areas, demonstrating public sector network integration in both the Hampshire HPSN2 network and in Kent's community network. Project Pathway was established as a pilot linking these two county-wide networks, with Virgin Media Business and Global Crossing the subscriber and GCN network elements. Staffordshire County Council was the first council in England to establish a PSN that included the county's NHS Health partners. Other county councils have since followed the leads of these councils.

== Transition ==
Centrally procured public sector networks are expected to migrate across to the PSN framework as they reach the end of their contract terms, either through an interim framework or directly. The Government Secure Intranet (GSi) contracts expired in September 2011, running on to 12 February 2012 and were replaced by the transitional Government Secure Intranet Convergence Framework (GCF). The Managed Telephony Service (MTS) contract expired on 31 December 2011 and was replaced by the Managed Telephony Convergence Framework (MTCF).

== Future plan ==
In a blog post published on 20 January 2017, Government Digital Service announced that the Technology Leaders Network (TLN) had agreed that government was starting a journey away from the PSN. This was because using the Internet was considered suitable for the vast majority of the work that the public sector does.

The blog post confirmed that the 'move was not going to happen immediately' and stated that 'there's quite a bit of work to do across the public sector to prepare for the changes'. It also stated that it was too early for a full timeline to be provided, although all PSN-connected organisations would be updated as the process evolved.

The blog post confirmed that organisations that need to access services that are only available on the PSN would still need to connect to it for the time being and continue to meet its assurance requirements.

In a blog post published on 16 March 2017, Government Digital Service (GDS) set out its plans for PSN assurance. The blog post confirmed that the PSN compliance process wasn't 'going anywhere, certainly for a while yet'. It explained that the TLN agreed that – as one of the only recognised, externally accredited, cross-government common assurance standards – it 'needs to live on far beyond the end of the physical PSN network'.

Government Digital Service, along with the National Cyber Security Centre (NCSC) and the Cyber and Government Security Directorate, are now looking at ways to expand and reframe PSN compliance in a new context that, while retaining the assurance principles that are the basis of the existing process, will aim to improve the process.

A GDS blog post titled 'The road to closing down the PSN' published on 8 September 2020 describes how the public sector will migrate away from the PSN. The Cabinet Office has set up a programme called Future Networks for Government (FN4G) to help organisations move away from the PSN.
