= Clemson–South Carolina football brawl =

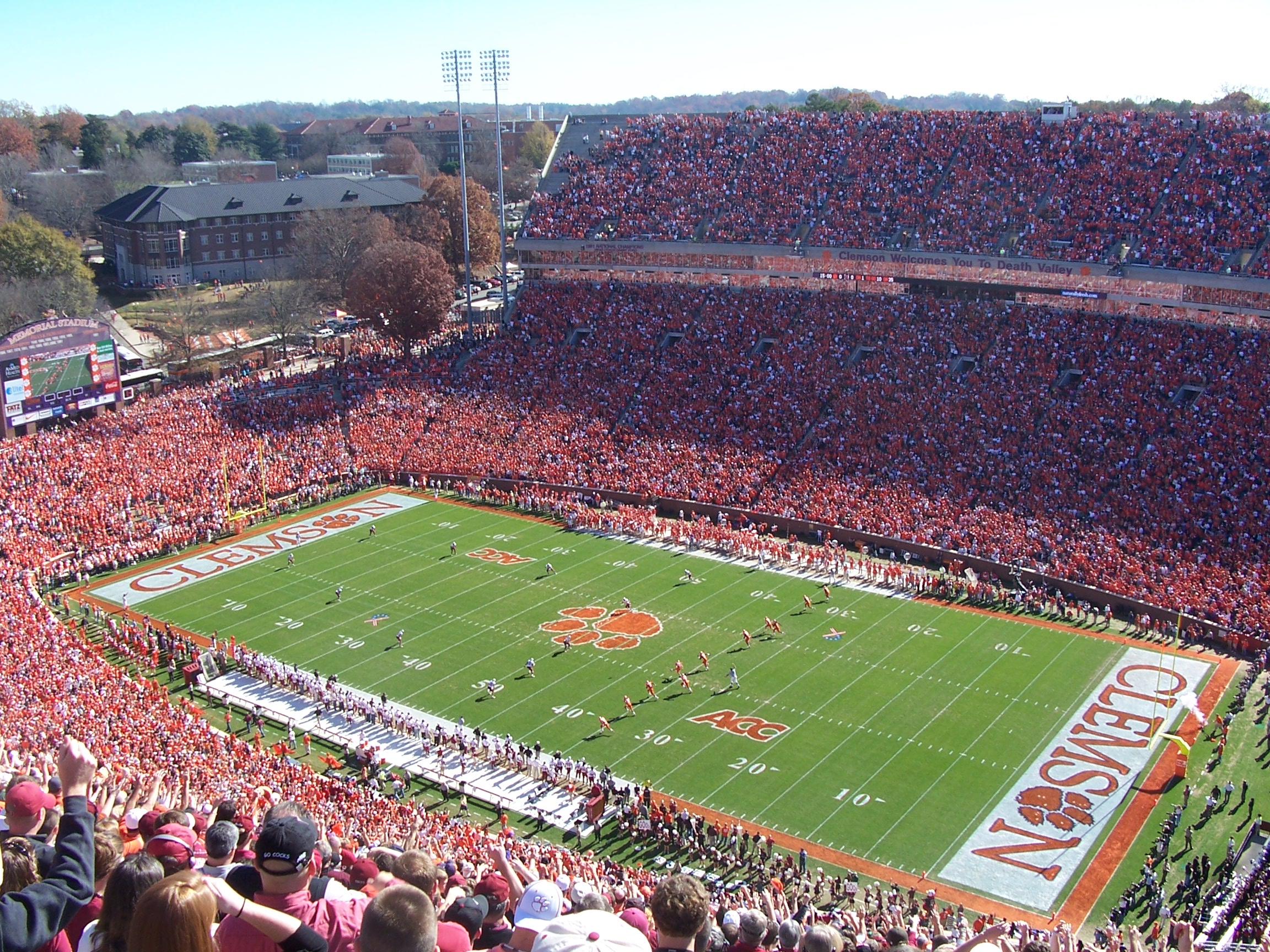
- Clemson and South Carolina playing in Memorial Stadium for the first time since the brawl
South Carolina Gamecocks	Clemson Tigers
(6–4)	(5–5)
7	29
Head coach: Lou Holtz	Head coach: Tommy Bowden
	1	2	3	4	Total
South Carolina	0	7	0	0	7
Clemson	14	0	12	3	29
- Date: November 20, 2004
- Season: 2004
- Stadium: Memorial Stadium
- Location: Clemson, South Carolina
- Referee: Doyle Jackson (SEC)
- Attendance: 82,500

United States TV coverage
- Network: Jefferson Pilot Sports
- Announcers: Dave Neal, Dave Rowe and Dave Baker

The Clemson–South Carolina football brawl was an on-field altercation during an American college football game between two rival schools, the University of South Carolina Gamecocks and the Clemson University Tigers. The incident took place on November 20, 2004, during the 2004 college football season at Memorial Stadium in Clemson, South Carolina. This disturbance led to serious repercussions handed down for those involved from the SEC (South Carolina's conference) and the ACC (Clemson's conference). This took place the day after a notable brawl at an NBA game in Detroit, the "Malice at the Palace".

== The fight ==
Prior to the contest, some South Carolina players congregated at the corner of the endzone near the bottom of "the Hill" at Memorial Stadium as Clemson made its traditional entrance to the field. Brief shoving ensued between Gamecock and Tiger players but was broken up quickly.

The brawl escalated late in the game after South Carolina quarterback Syvelle Newton was knocked to the ground after a shot to the helmet following an incomplete pass on 4th and 11 with 5:48 left to go in the fourth quarter, and Clemson players lay on top of him, preventing him from getting up. Players on the field from both teams were involved in shoving and punching, and both benches cleared as chaos erupted. The iconic image of the brawl was of Clemson's Yusef Kelly kicking a helmetless South Carolina player in the head as he lay face down, attempting to protect his head with his hands. State troopers, as well as other local law enforcement officers, entered the field to restore order. No fans entered the field during the chaos. Play was suspended for six minutes.

The fight overshadowed the last game in which Lou Holtz participated as South Carolina's head coach, as he retired at the end of the season. Holtz said that he "is going to be remembered along with former Ohio State coach Woody Hayes for having a fight at the Clemson game," alluding to the 1978 Gator Bowl. Steve Spurrier thereafter took over the position (coincidentally, Holtz was an assistant under Hayes during the Buckeyes' 1968 national championship season). Clemson won the game 29–7.

The following year (2005), in a showing of sportsmanship which was coordinated by both schools' athletic departments and administrations, both teams met at midfield at Williams-Brice Stadium at the University of South Carolina and shook hands.

== The consequences ==
The ACC and SEC reviewed the tapes of both incidents before handing out proper punishments to players. However, both schools imposed a punishment of their own on November 22, by saying that neither team would be permitted to play in a bowl game because of the brawl.

Both the SEC and ACC suspended players from each school, with the SEC's penalties effective for South Carolina's first game of the 2005–06 season, against Central Florida, while the ACC allowed Clemson to stagger the suspensions for its offending players at various games during the 2005–06 season.

The ACC's policy on players serving suspensions permitted Clemson to punish the players during the season, and not an immediate penalty during the Tigers' first game of 2005, against Texas A&M. Some of the offending players were involved in the crucial game, which resulted in a Tigers win in the final seconds. The penalties were served, based on a case-by-case basis, in midseason games against winless Temple and one-win Duke.

== Legacy ==
The 2004 brawl has been credited with starting "somewhat of a culture and character transformation" in the Gamecocks program that has lasted until this day.

== See also ==
- Clemson–South Carolina rivalry
- FIU–Miami football brawl, a similar incident during a 2006 college football game
- Pacers–Pistons brawl, a noteworthy brawl in the NBA that occurred the night before the Clemson–South Carolina brawl
- List of historically significant college football games
- List of nicknamed college football games and plays
