= NetResult =

NetResult is the name of several United Kingdom-based companies.

== First company ==
The first company, Net Result.uk.com Ltd (Trading as NetResult), is an IT company formed in 1996 that specialises in managed IT support for business, consultancy, cyber security, hosting and other IT services. Headquartered in Mold, Flintshire, Wales; it was founded in 1996 by Nick Bell.

== Second company ==
The second is London-based, formed in 2000 and incorporated at Companies House in December 2002. It specialised in the protection of intellectual property (such as trademarks and copyrights) on the internet.

=== Operations ===
NetResult was hired by the UEFA to deal with problems with copyright infringement, specifically online postings of highlights and live web streams of Premier League matches. They have issued takedown notices to many Internet sites hosting and linking to highlights from Premier League telecasts, including YouTube.

== Third company ==
A third company, describing itself as Netresult Ltd, trades as Netresult Training. It is associated with another trading name, Netresult Web Design.

== Fourth company ==
The fourth company, NetResult Ltd., which was an early producer of websites and related digital marketing materials, founded in Brighton in 1995. Their clients included major companies such as Schering-Plough (for a website about the Clarityn antihistamine). They were located directly above the premises of a pioneering internet service provider, Pavilion Internet, which was later acquired by Easynet. This NetResult ceased business by 1997.
