= Keith Teare =

British businessman (born 1954)

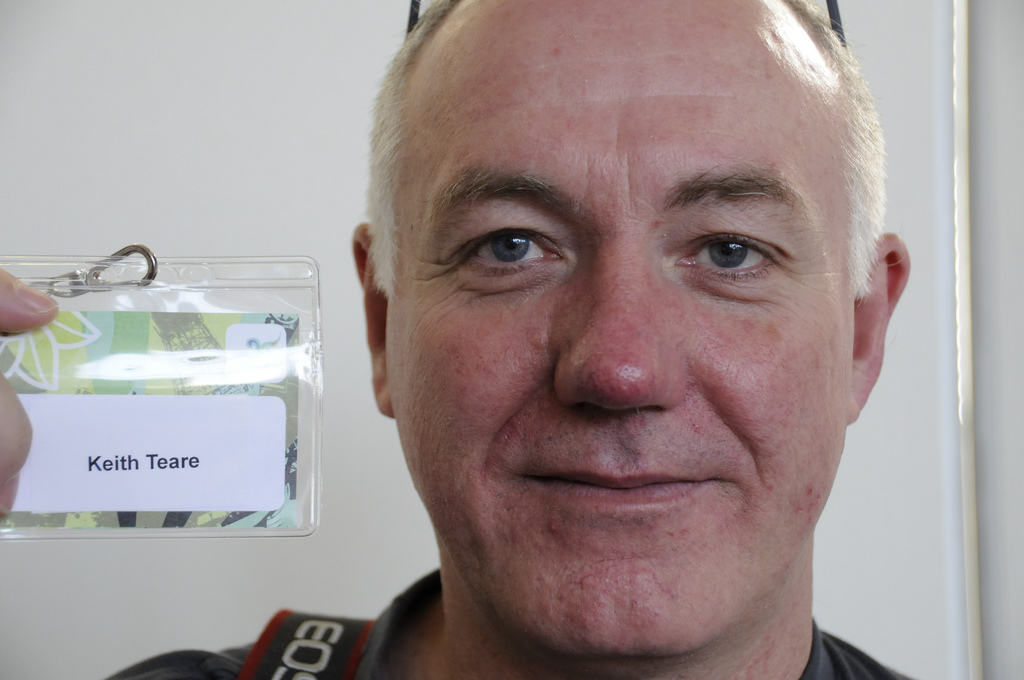
- Teare at iSummit'08, July 2008
- Born: 27 August 1954 (age 71); Scarborough, North Riding of Yorkshire, England
- Occupation: Entrepreneur
- Spouse: Gené Teare
- Children: Dylan Teare, Liam Teare, Luke Teare
- Website: www.teare.com

Keith Teare (born 27 August 1954, in Scarborough, North Riding of Yorkshire) is an English-American technology entrepreneur.

== Career ==
Keith Teare has founded or co-founded several IT companies since the early 1980s.

He is credited with being part of:

- Cyberia, the UK's first internet cafe;
- Easynet, Europe's first consumer Internet Service Provider;
- RealNames, the first multi-lingual addressing system for the Internet;
- Archimedes Ventures LLC, a vehicle for his incubation, investments and consulting service;
- TechCrunch, a technology blog;
- Just.me, an instant messaging service;
- chat.center, a web to mobile SaaS messaging service;
- Accelerated Digital Ventures.;
- SignalRank, an Index of top private companies

In 2017, Teare joined Oldham blockchain company Energy Mine.

== Controversy ==
In 2018, TechCrunch founder Michael Arrington published a blog post alleging that Teare had misrepresented his role in TechCrunch's founding. Arrington asserted that Teare had initially dismissed the idea for the site and later sought to associate himself with its creation despite not having contributed to its launch or early development.

Teare rejected these claims, stating that he had never presented himself as a founder of TechCrunch. He maintained that Arrington established the publication in 2005 while both were partners in an LLC called Archimedes Ventures, and that his involvement consisted of providing support during the blog’s formative period rather than participating in its editorial or operational setup.

== Works ==
- Tompson, Keith (1988). Under Siege: Racism and Violence in Britain Today. London: Penguin Books. ISBN 9780140523911. "Keith Tompson is a pen name for Silicon Valley entrepreneur Keith Teare. He was active in anti-racist campaigns in the UK between 1979 and 1996. This book was written at a time when extreme right wing groups were targeting activists, hence the use of a pen name to protect his identity."
