= Wayne Mansfield =

Australian businessman

- Born: Margaret River, Western Australia
- Occupation: Direct marketing
- Children: 3

Wayne Mansfield, of Perth, Western Australia, was the head of direct marketing business T3 Direct Marketing, operating under a series of two-dollar companies, and in 2005 became the first Australian to be prosecuted for email spamming.

== Spamming cases ==
Mansfield was a junk faxer in the mid-1990s before turning to spamming, in which he promoted seminar-hosting companies he ran, including The Maverick Partnership and Business Seminars Australia. These messages admitted he had harvested emails from "various publicly available sources and other marketing promotions", but included instructions for recipients to unsubscribe from the list.

T3 Direct was blacklisted along with the company in June 2002 by the Spam Prevention Early Warning System (SPEWS), along with its ISP, Swiftel (now People Telecom). Swiftel suspended T3 Direct's online access for this, and also violation of its terms of service. T3 Direct was left with A$4,578 in charges outstanding to Swiftel. However, Mansfield insisted that it was the other arm of his business, concerned with web design and the management of opt-in databases, which suffered as a result.

In July of the same year, Mansfield began legal action against Perth technician and anti-spam campaigner Joey McNicol. After receiving spam from Mansfield and discovering that the unsubscribe option did not work, and that contact details in the messages were fake, McNicol had set up a website publishing the details of T3 Direct and other Mansfield companies, as well as publishing these details in newsgroups. Mansfield accused McNicol of sending his company's IP address to SPEWS, prompting the blacklisting, but lost the case as he was unable to prove McNicol had actually contacted SPEWS, and in any case the action was not ruled to be illegal. Although Mansfield's company was ordered to pay McNicol's costs in the action, Mansfield shut down that company without paying those costs and continued business using a new company. McNicol's legal fees were in part paid by donations.

In August 2013, Mansfield was fined NZ$95,000 in New Zealand under the Unsolicited Electronic Messages Act 2007 for sending unsolicited email communications. The case was brought by the Department of Internal Affairs (New Zealand) after it had received 53 complaints relating to unsolicited email from Mansfield and his entities between April and September 2010.

In 2015 Mansfield has resumed spamming, this time using a not for profit charity "The Jindalee Foundation" in an attempt to skirt anti-spam laws.

== Spam Act 2003 ==
In June 2005 the then Australian Communications Authority (ACA) (Now known as the Australian Communications & Media Authority – ACMA) brought proceedings against Mansfield and his new company, Clarity1 under the recently passed Spam Act 2003 where ACMA alleged that they were involved in the sending of 56 million spam emails during 2004. He however insisted that sending commercial emails was his "right", but claimed he had not harvested any new email addresses since the Spam Act came into force, arguing that because he had started spamming the recipients before the Spam Act and the recipients had not unsubscribed, he could infer consent (an argument that did not find favour with the Court). He also stated that telephone operators at his company had been subjected to abuse by irate callers, but promised that unsubscribe requests were handled "within minutes". He defended his campaign, citing 20,000 attendees at his business seminars.

ACMA's complaint in this matter was upheld in the Australia Federal Court on 13 April 2006. The Court imposed a penalty of A$4.5 million on Clarity1, and A$1 million on Wayne Mansfield, on 27 October 2006.

== Disqualified ==
In April 2009, the Australian Securities and Investments Commission (ASIC) disqualified Mansfield from managing corporations for four years following their investigation into his role in two failed companies. These companies were Clarity1 Pty Ltd, which was at the centre of the spam case, and The Which Company Pty Ltd. "ASIC found that the companies had failed with substantial statutory debts accrued over a substantial period and that Mr Mansfield's management and involvement in the affairs of Clarity1 Pty Ltd and Which Co Pty Ltd did not meet the standards required of a person in his position."

== See also ==
- List of spammers
