= Not Just Another Bogus List =

Former DNS blacklist

Not Just Another Bogus List (NJABL) was a DNS blacklist. NJABL maintained a list of known and potential spam sources (open mail relays, open proxies, open form to mail HTTP gateways, dynamic IP pools, and direct spammers) for the purpose of being able to tag or refuse e-mail and thereby block spam from certain sources. NJABL automatically retests only listed open relays every 90 days.

== Overview ==
The Open Proxy IPs portion (only) of NJABL data was used in Spamhaus XBL list NJABL's dynamic IP list originally came from Dynablock but was maintained independently since Dynablock stopped updating December 2003. The SORBS dynamic IP list is also a development from Dynablock, but is more aggressively inclusive than NJABL's version.

== Timeline ==
As of March 1, 2013, NJABL was in the process of being shut down. The DNSBL zones were emptied. After "the Internet" has had some time to remove NJABL from server configs, the NS's will be pointed off into unallocated space (192.0.2.0/24 TEST-NET-1) to hopefully make the shutdown obvious to those who were slower to notice.

As of April 29, the above-mentioned pointing of the DNSBL NS's into 192.0.2.0/24 had been completed.

As of Jan 02/2019, the domain name njabl.org was set to expire and dns servers were switched to tucows autorenew servers which would cause any lookups by servers still not having removed the configuration to have rejections.

In January 2024, the domain was picked up by a domain squatter which activated a wildcard DNS record, and as a result, servers which were still erroneously configured to use NJABL began rejecting all emails.
