= Government Secure Intranet =

United Kingdom government wide area network

Government Secure Intranet (GSi) was a United Kingdom government wide area network, whose main purpose was to enable connected organisations to communicate electronically and securely at low protective marking levels. It was known for the '.gsi.gov.uk' family of domains for government email. Migration away from these domains began in 2019 and was completed in 2023.

== History ==
=== Use ===
Many UK government organisations used the GSi to transfer files on a peer-to-peer (P2P) basis between similarly accredited networks. The network itself was open within the context of its accreditation – it imposed no restrictions on traffic types carried across the network, restrictions and policy control were left to the connecting departments. Email traffic in and out of the network was filtered by an external provider.

=== Origin ===
The concept of GSi was defined by the Cabinet Office, and was turned into practical reality by the Internet Special Products group of Cable & Wireless (then known as Mercury Communications) at their Brentford premises. GSi development started late 1996, and can be roughly dated by checking the registration date of its first domain name, 'gsi.net', registered 30 May 1997. The formal go-live date was several months later (according to the Central Computer and Telecommunications Agency (CCTA) this was February 1998).

The main drivers behind the development of GSi was the plethora of inter-agency connections in UK government which made managing security and connectivity budgets problematic. GSi not only provided better oversight, it also normalised connectivity. GSi was designed as an accredited, dual link connected Internet Protocol backbone, it imposed no restrictions on what type of traffic it carried; any restrictions were considered a policy decision for each connecting department.

The design of GSi partly supported the then developing eGIF interoperability standards. This was a direct consequence of the two key technical people driving the project, one from Cable & Wireless, one from the UK government in the form of the CCTA.

GSi used SMTP as mail transport protocol, and the conversion from the then prevalent X.400 email facilities to SMTP proved for many departments an improvement in reliability and speed. In the case of X.400, this conversion also cut email costs substantially as X.400 message conversions were still chargeable even if the conversion failed due to message size. In some cases, the ROI of such an email conversion was as short as two months.

The creation of GSi handed Cable & Wireless a monopoly on UK government data connectivity. GSi can be considered one of the more successful UK government IT projects from the point of view of take up - even when still in pilot phase, demand increased to a point where service windows had to be imposed to continue building the platform to full strength.

The development of GSi was also the root of the creation of the CESG Listed Adviser Scheme (CLAS). During the build of GSi, the need for accredited advisers became clear as advice on connectivity invariably involved discussing government confidential matters. CESG eventually responded with the above CLAS scheme.

=== Operations contract ===
GSi was operated on a five-year renewable contract basis. Energis won this contract from Cable & Wireless in August 2003. Cable & Wireless then bought Energis in 2005, thus regaining control over the platform.

Cable and Wireless Worldwide won the GSi Convergence Framework (GCF) contract in 2011.

The GSi and Managed Telecommunications Service (MTS) framework agreements finished in August 2011 with contracts running on to 12 February 2012. GCF is intended to facilitate the migration to the Public Services Network.

=== Previous developments ===
Government Connect went live across local authorities in England and Wales. Government Connect is a pan-government programme providing an accredited and secure network between central government and every local authority in England and Wales and allows exchange of RESTRICTED information between authorities. The GCSX network is part of the wider GSi and provides connectivity to nearly all central departments. Scottish local authorities have already established a similar network known as the Government Secure Extranet (GSX).

Local authorities with a GCSX connection can now use a GCSX email account to exchange sensitive data, including DWP benefits data, patient identifiable data, with health sector staff who have a NHS.net email address, e.g. PCT staff and GPs.

As both GCSX and the Police National Network (PNN) are both connected to the wider Government Secure Intranet (GSi), data can be transferred securely between local authorities and the Police.

GC Mail can be used now to replace the existing less efficient and less secure methods of exchanging data between local authorities and the Police. Local authorities that deliver Housing and Council Tax benefits are taking part in the e-Transfers programme, which is e-enabling the process for delivery of Local Authority Input Documents (LAIDs) and Local Authority Claim Information (LACIs).

Version 4.1 of the Code of Connection for compliance was introduced in 2010.

Compared with version 3.2 the main Code of Connection version 4.1 areas of are:

- Mobile working - full implementation of compliant service
- Firewall specification (EAL 4)
- Execution of unauthorised software
- Requirement for IT Healthchecks (CHECK / CREST / TigerScheme)
- Labelling e-mails with protective markings.

== Public Services Network ==
The Public Services Network is a UK Government programme that unified the provision of network infrastructure across the United Kingdom public sector into an interconnected "network of networks". This included large elements of GSi. It is now a legacy network.

Centrally procured public sector networks migrated across to the PSN framework as they reached the end of their contract terms, either through an interim framework or directly. The Government Secure Intranet (GSi) contracts expired in September 2011, running on to 12 February 2012 and were replaced by the transitional Government Secure Intranet Convergence Framework (GCF).
