= Joey McNicol =

Joey McNicol is an activist against E-mail spam. He became notable after a high-profile court case in which he was the defendant. The case alleged that he had caused IP addresses of companies controlled by Wayne Mansfield to be blacklisted. The case against him was dismissed in October 2002.

== See also ==
- Spam Act 2003
- Wayne Mansfield
