= David Rowe (entrepreneur) =

British entrepreneur (born 1958)

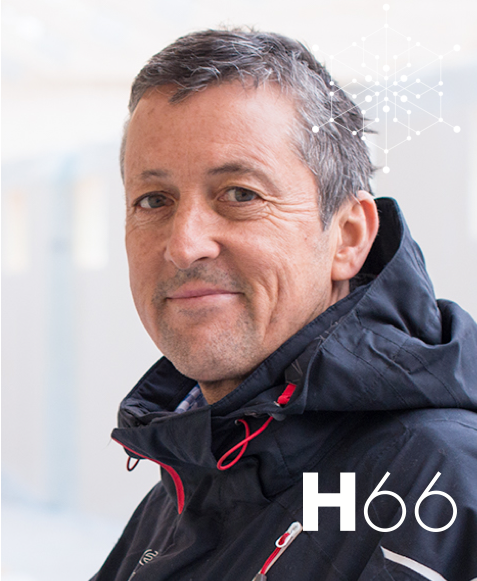
- Born: David Stanley Rowe; December 18, 1958 (age 67); Plymouth, UK
- Education: University of Portsmouth (Business BA 1981) Coventry University (Computer Science MSc)
- Occupations: Entrepreneur, Venture Capitalist, Philanthropist
- Years active: 1990-present
- Title: Chairman and CEO of Sixty Six Capital, Chairman of Black Green Capital, (former) CEO of Hydro66 Inc and Easynet, Co-founder of CSBI (Poland), Co-founder of Cyberia, London
- Partner: Eva Pascoe
- Children: 3
- Website: https://www.sixtysixcapital.com/

David Rowe (born 1958) is a London-based high tech entrepreneur who founded Easynet, a U.K. ISP in 1994, alongside Cyberia, one of the world's first commercial cybercafes. In recent years, he has founded his own high-tech venture capital business Black Green Capital in 2013 as well as founding Hydro66 an Ultra Green Datacentre project based out of Boden, Sweden.

In 2005, Rowe was selected by the National Portrait Gallery for entrepreneurship in Telecoms and the Internet. David competes for the GB team in age group triathlon and duathlon events

== Early life and career ==
David was brought up in Plymouth, England and went to the local comprehensive school: Plymstock Comprehensive. In 1977, David went to Portsmouth Polytechnic sponsored by Kodak to study Business Studies (BA) and on completion moved to Singapore to teach English. Whilst there David played football for Tiong Bahru and helped win the Presidents Cup in 1982. From Singapore David went to Tokyo and studied Japanese and taught English from 1983-1986. On return to England David completed an MSc in Computing at Coventry University, joined the sales team of software company CSB with their construction industry product COINS, and went on to co-found CSBI in Poland in 1990, a banking software start-up in Poland sold in 1994 to Computerland.

== Business career ==
In 1994, David founded Easynet, a U.K. ISP, alongside Cyberia, one of the world's first commercial cybercafes. Easynet was one of the first Internet companies in the U.K. to list on AIM in 1996, and subsequently on the LSE in 1999. Easynet created subsidiaries in a number of European countries and pioneered alternative local loop infrastructure in the UK. In 2001, Easynet merged with Ipsaris, the U.K. fibre optic infrastructure provider owned by Marconi. In 2006, Easynet was bought by BSkyB for £211m and Rowe worked for James Murdoch as part of the Sky management team. In 2010, Rowe led the buyout team of Easynet Corporate services from Sky alongside LDC, a UK private equity company owned by Lloyds Bank. In 2013, David left Easynet to start his own high tech venture capital business Black Green Capital.

Among the investments was Hydro66 an Ultra Green Datacenter project optimised for minimum carbon footprint using hydropower and based in Northern Sweden. David became Chairman and in 2018 Hydro66 listed on the Canadian secondary stock exchange (CSE) via a reverse take-over. In 2019 David became the CEO of Hydro66.

In March 2021, Hydro66 was sold to Northern Data a specialist HPC infrastructure company listed on the Deutsche Borse. Hydro66 subsequently changed its name to Sixty Six Capital and remained on the CSE as a publicly listed investment company.
