= Kent Public Service Network =

The Kent Public Service Network (KPSN) is a Public Services Network that provides connectivity to Kent and Medway. It was built upon the Kent Community Network (KCN), which provided the broadband wide area network (WAN) for schools and Kent County Council facilities in Kent, United Kingdom.

== History ==
=== Kent Community Network ===
KCN logo

KCN area and local nodes

Kent schools first used the Internet in 1985 for international email projects. Kent County Council's NGfL programme of 1998 provided every primary and special school with an Internet-connected laptop computer and provided networked access to secondary schools. DfES made Kent an ICT Pathfinder authority. KCN currently provided broadband to over 540 schools. Internet connectivity was provided by two 2.5 Gbit/s connections, which terminate at the Maidstone and Canterbury WAN centres; these links were provided by KentMAN, a JANET service provider.

The Kent Community Network provided broadband connectivity to every part of Kent, whether urban, rural or coastal. It aims to connect every secondary, primary and special school using a high-capacity connection which usually means optical fiber cable to the school. The Kent Community Network provided Websense filtering to member schools.

=== Kent Public Service Network ===
KPSN began to be built from the KCN infrastructure in 2008. The Public Services Network provides connectivity to Kent and Medway.
