= TechCrunch =

American technology news website

TechCrunch Media LLC
- Website type: Technology news and analysis
- Available in: English; Chinese; French; Japanese
- Headquarters: San Francisco, California, United States
- Owners: AOL (2010–2017); Yahoo! Inc. (2017–2025); Regent LP (2025–present)
- Creators: Michael Arrington, Keith Teare
- Editor: Matthew Panzarino
- Website: techcrunch.com
- Commercial: Yes
- Registration: None
- Launched: June 10, 2005; 21 years ago
- Current status: Active

TechCrunch is an American global online newspaper focusing on topics regarding high-tech and startup companies. It was founded in June 2005 by Archimedes Ventures, led by partners Michael Arrington and Keith Teare. In 2010, AOL acquired the company for approximately $25 million. Following the 2015 acquisition of AOL and Yahoo! by Verizon, the site was owned by Verizon Media from 2015 through 2021.

In 2021, Verizon sold its media assets, including AOL, Yahoo!, and TechCrunch, to the private equity firm Apollo Global Management. Apollo integrated them into a new entity called Yahoo! Inc. In addition to its news reporting, TechCrunch is also known for its annual Disrupt conference, a technology event hosted in several cities across the United States, Europe, and China.

== History ==
TechCrunch was founded in June 2005 by Archimedes Ventures, led by partners Michael Arrington and Keith Teare. In 2010, AOL acquired the company for approximately $25 million. As of 2013, TechCrunch was available in English, Chinese (managed by Chinese tech news company TechNode), and Japanese. TechCrunch France was folded into the main TechCrunch.com site in October 2012. Boundless (formerly Verizon Media Japan), the Japanese subsidiary of the TechCrunch's parent company, closed TechCrunch Japan in May 2022 according to its "global strategy".

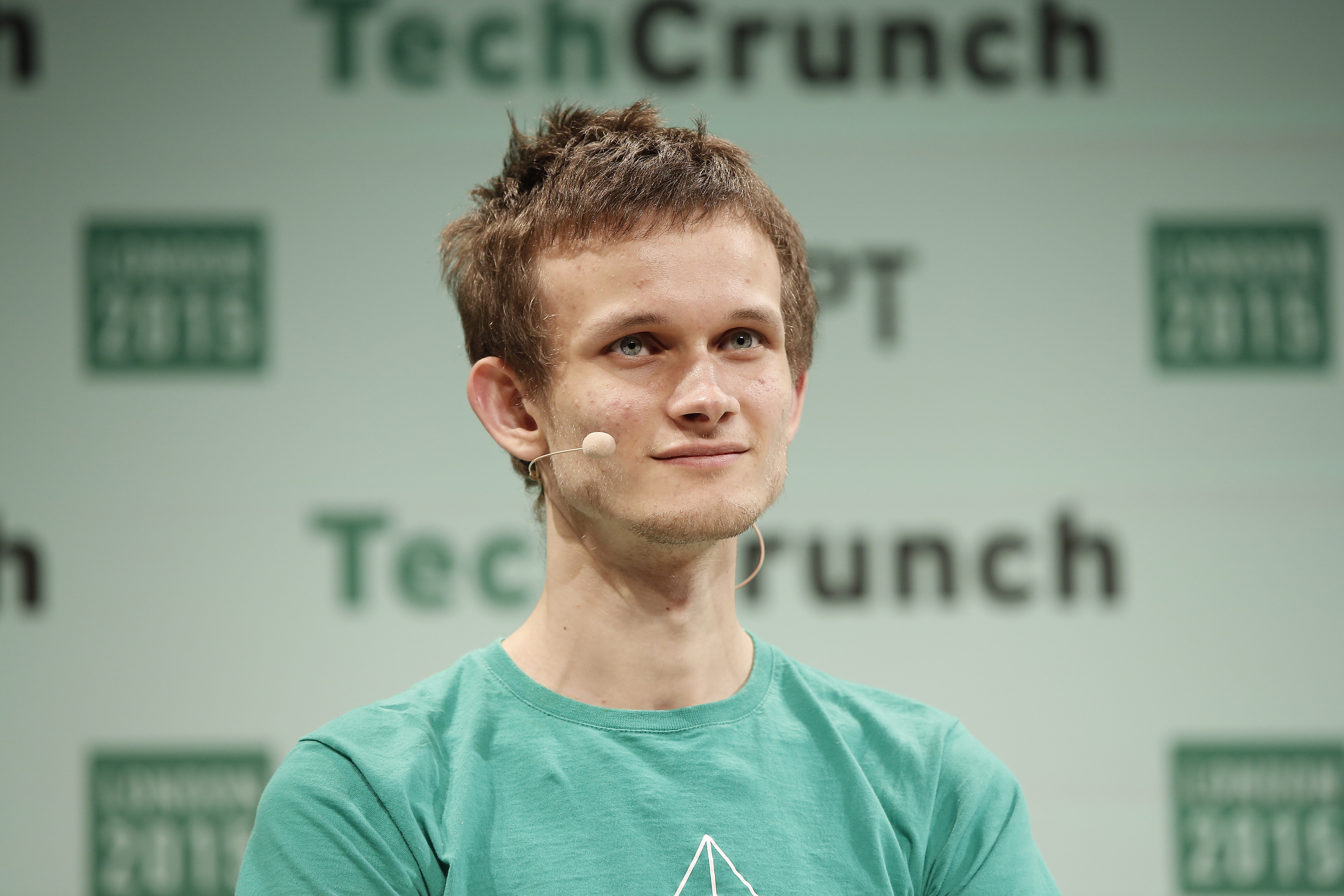
Ethereum founder Vitalik Buterin at the TechCrunch event in 2015

Following the acquisition of AOL and Yahoo by Verizon, TechCrunch was owned by Verizon Media from 2015 through 2021. In August 2020, the COO of TechCrunch, Ned Desmond, stepped down after eight years in the company. He announced that he would join the venture capital firm SOSV in December 2020 as a senior operating partner. His former role at TechCrunch was replaced by Matthew Panzarino, former editor-in-chief, and Joey Hinson, director of business operations.

In 2021, Verizon sold its media assets, including AOL, Yahoo, and TechCrunch, to the private equity firm Apollo Global Management, and Apollo integrated them into a new entity called Yahoo! Inc. TechCrunch's monthly visitors in September 2024 were 12.12 million, according to data from SEMRush. In March 2025, Yahoo! Inc. sold TechCrunch to private equity firm Regent LP. A few months later Sifted reported the website shut down its European operations, which was later denied by TechCrunch Chairman and Publisher Michael Reinstein.

== Events ==
=== TechCrunch Disrupt ===
Starting in New York City in 2010, TechCrunch hosts an annual tech conference, TechCrunch Disrupt, in several cities in the United States and Europe. The event brings entrepreneurs, investors and tech enthusiasts together to watch startups pitch their ideas to a panel of judges, participate in networking events, listen to keynote speeches and panel discussions.

=== Startup Battlefield ===
Startup Battlefield is a startup competition, presenting 20 finalists on stage at the annual TechCrunch Disrupt. The finalists are narrowed down to five on the final day, where they are given a chance to pitch once more before one is chosen as the winner. The monetary award is $100,000. Startup Battlefield has a reputation for launching some of the most successful companies in the tech industry. Notable startups that have been involved in the competition include Dropbox, Intuit Mint, Yammer, Parallel Health, and CrateDB.

== Former features ==
=== Crunchbase ===
From 2007 to 2015, TechCrunch operated Crunchbase, a website and online encyclopedia of information on startups, key people, funds, funding rounds, and events. In 2015, Crunchbase became a private entity and is no longer part of TechCrunch.

=== Crunchies ===
From 2007 to 2017, TechCrunch sponsored the annual Crunchies award ceremony to award startups, internet, and technology innovations. At the first award ceremony in 2007, Facebook won the award for best startup. TechCrunch announced in 2017 that it would end the Crunchies.

== Controversies ==
In 2011, the site's editors and writers were criticized for possible ethics violations. These included claims that Arrington's investments in certain firms that the site had covered created a conflict of interest. The controversy that ensued eventually led to Arrington's departure, and other writers, including Paul Carr and Sarah Lacy, moved to another technology investment media company.

At TechCrunch Disrupt 2013, TechCrunch faced criticism for allowing a presentation of a mobile app called Titstare, created by two Australian developers. The app, which purportedly allowed users to share photos of men staring at women's breasts, was widely condemned as sexist and inappropriate. The incident drew negative media attention, including coverage from CNN and The Guardian, and prompted TechCrunch to issue a public apology and pledge stricter content review for future events.

== In popular culture ==
In 2014, TechCrunch Disrupt was featured in an arc of the HBO series Silicon Valley. The characters' startup "Pied Piper" participates in a startup battle at TechCrunch Disrupt.
