= Steve Linford =

CEO of The Spamhaus Project

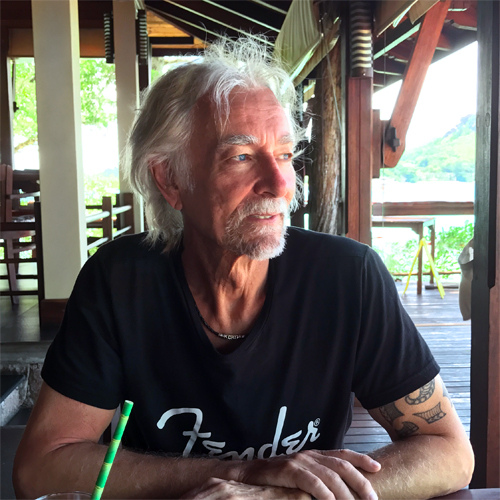
Linford in 2023

Stephen John "Steve" Linford (born 12 December 1956) is a British entrepreneur and anti-spam campaigner best known for founding The Spamhaus Project.

Linford was born in London, England, in 1956. His family moved to Rome, Italy, where Steve attended St. George's British International School. After leaving college to pursue a music career, Linford made his living writing music and playing with Italian, German and English rock groups. For a number of years he was under contract to Italy's 'GM' record label and worked on film music with composer Ennio Morricone In the early 1980s he became involved in concert production. When artists including Pink Floyd and Michael Jackson toured Italy, Linford served as their Production Manager.

As computers began to be used in the music industry, Linford developed an interest in computer technology. In 1986 he moved to England, where he set up a software company whose flagship product was a file-searching program called UltraFind for the Apple Macintosh similar to, but predating by many years, Apple's Sherlock. With the arrival of the Internet Linford refocused the company in 1996 as an internet technologies company called Ultradesign Internet, around which he built a server hosting network called UXN.

Finding that his customers were being harassed with junk emails, he sought ways to stop the problem and in doing so became an anti-spam campaigner. In 1998 he founded Spamhaus.

With the support of the internet's major networks, Spamhaus started a real-time spam-blacklisting database which was then used by internet service providers, governments and military networks to block billions of junk and virus emails from reaching internet users and this activity made Linford a target for cyber-criminals whose operations were crippled by Spamhaus. He received death threats from criminal spam gangs around the world, many of which were posted online.

Today his project's technologies are used by an estimated three-quarters of the world's internet networks and serve over 3.1 billion email users.

In 2005 Linford left England and currently resides in the Principality of Andorra. He is CEO of the Spamhaus organisation, a group of several companies based in the UK and Andorra working in communications filter technology and cybersecurity.

== Awards ==
In 2003 The New York Times dedicated the front page of its Business section to an article about Steve Linford. Since then he has spoken on spam and cybersecurity at government hearings, the European Parliament and the UN. In 2003 he was named as one of the technical industry's 'Top 50 Agenda Setters' by Silicon Magazine. In 2004 he was given the Internet Hero Award by the British ISP Association ISPA. In 2005 he was nominated for Outstanding Contribution to the UK Technology Industry.
