= Michael Arrington =

Founder and former co-editor of TechCrunch

J. Michael Arrington
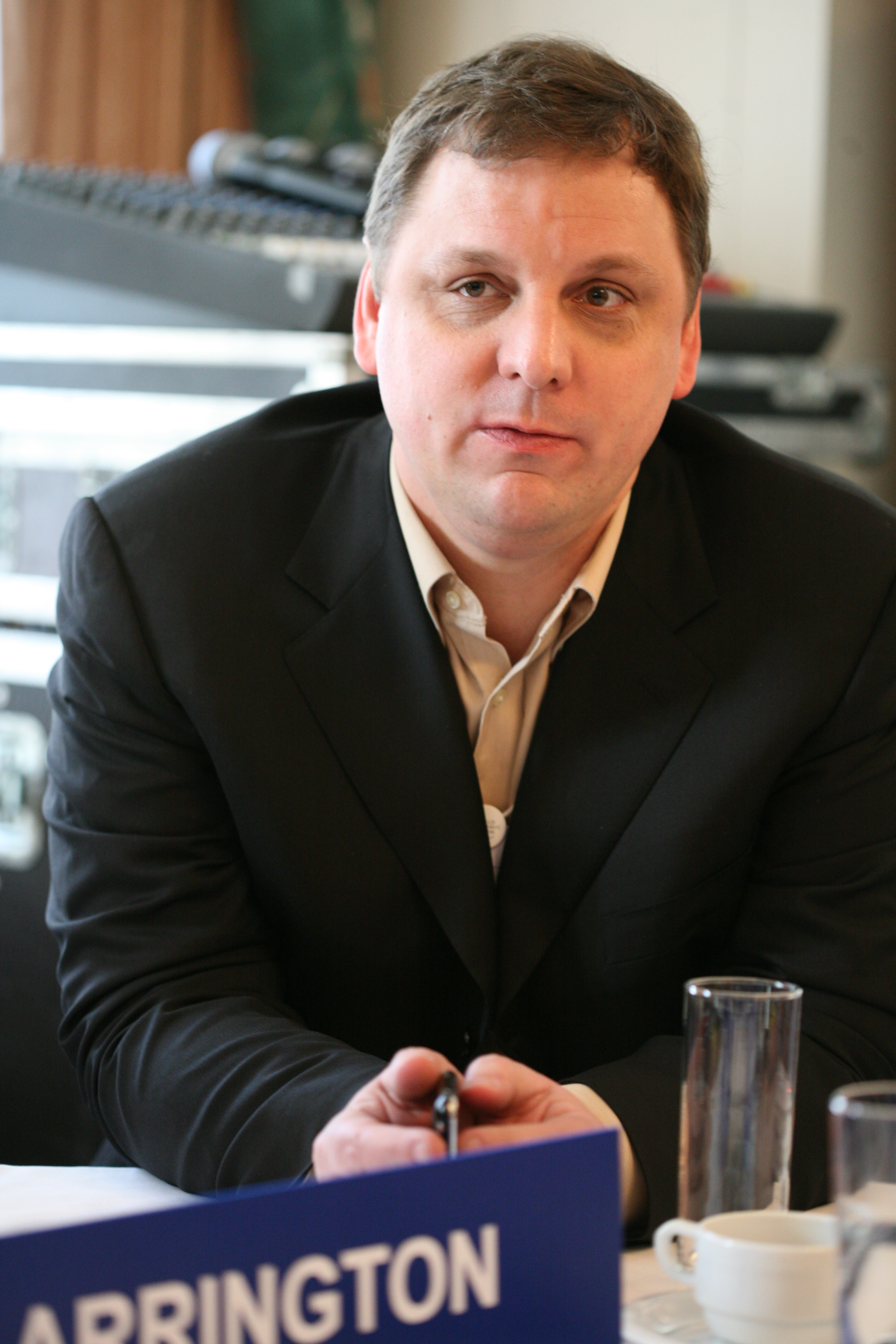
- Arrington at the World Economic Forum, 2009
- Born: Jack Michael Arrington; March 13, 1970 (age 56); Orange, California, U.S.
- Occupations: Blogger, entrepreneur

J. Michael Arrington (born March 13, 1970) is the American founder and former co-editor of TechCrunch, a blog covering the Silicon Valley technology start-up communities and the wider technology field in America and elsewhere. Magazines such as Wired and Forbes have named Arrington one of the most powerful people on the Internet. In 2008, he was selected by TIME Magazine as one of the most influential people in the world.

== Biography ==
Born in Huntington Beach, California, Arrington grew up in Huntington Beach and Surrey, England. He attended the University of California, Berkeley for his freshman year and graduated from Claremont McKenna College with a major in economics. He went on to Stanford Law School and graduated in 1995. He practiced corporate and securities law at O'Melveny & Myers and Wilson Sonsini Goodrich & Rosati.

Arrington left the practice of law to join RealNames, which failed after raising $100 million. Arrington was co-founder of Achex, an internet payments company, which was sold to First Data Corp for US$32 million and is now the back end of Western Union online. "I made enough to buy a Porsche. Not much more," he said in 2007.

His other entrepreneurial endeavors include co-founding Zip.ca and Pool.com, acting as chief operating officer for Razorgator, and founding Edgeio. He has also served on the board of directors at the startup Foldera, which was designing a software as a service organizational tool.

He identifies as a libertarian, saying, "I just see government as this thing that stops us from doing things."

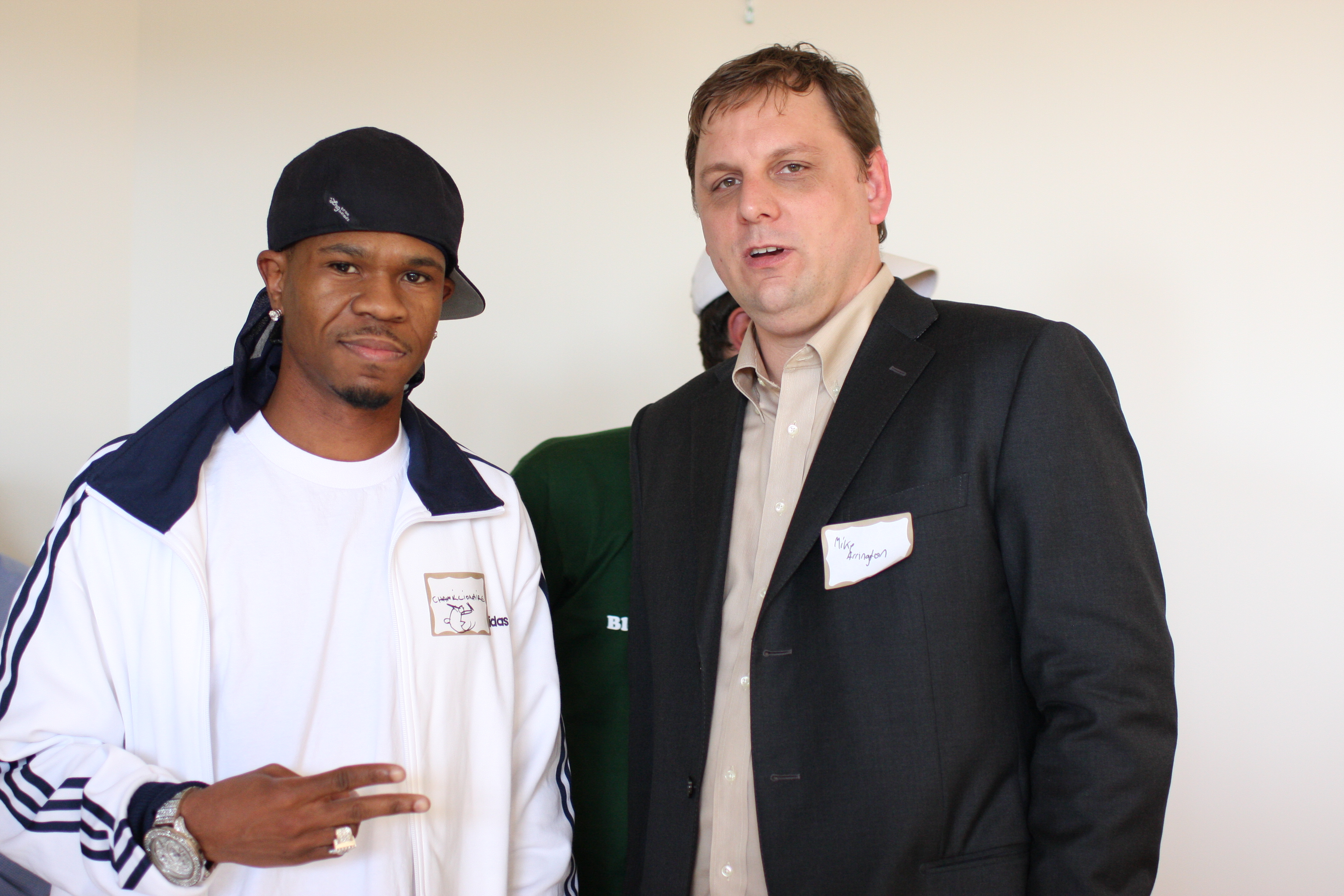
Michael Arrington with Chamillionaire

In 2013, he was accused of physical abuse by an ex-girlfriend. Arrington sued the woman for defamation and she agreed to retract her accusations against him and apologize.

== TechCrunch ==
Arrington rose to internet prominence with his Silicon Valley blog, TechCrunch. TechCrunch covers internet startups and news. In early September 2011, Arrington was reported to be no longer employed by TechCrunch but associated with a new investment company, AOL Ventures. Within days, it was being reported that he was no longer associated with AOL Ventures.

In October 2012, Arrington returned to writing for the TechCrunch blog.

== CrunchFund ==
In 2011, Arrington founded a venture capital firm called CrunchFund along with M. G. Siegler and Patrick Gallagher. In 2014, CrunchFund invested in BlueFly, an online retailer, which was bought, in May 2013, by affiliates of Clearlake Capital for US$13 million. As a result of CrunchFund's investment, former BlueFly CEO Melissa Payner returned to BlueFly.

== CrunchPad ==
In July 2008, Arrington started a project called the Crunchpad, over a year before the iPad was released. The Crunchpad was meant to be an affordable tablet computer that catered to a niche between desktop computers and laptops. However, disputes arose between Arrington and the developers he had chosen for the Crunchpad. The developers broke off from Arrington and released the device on their own but it received few sales, and the developers later went bankrupt.

== Arrington Capital ==
In November 2017, Michael Arrington announced he was starting a $100 million hedge fund. The fund would be denominated in the cryptocurrency XRP, also known as Ripple. It was reported to be the first fund denominated in a cryptocurrency, rather than US dollars or Euros at the time. The fund has invested in more than 50 crypto startups.
