= David M. Rowe =

American political scientist

- Education: Duke University (PhD, 1993), 1985 — Master of Arts from Johns Hopkins University (MA, 1985), Davidson College (BA, 1982)
- Scientific career
- Institutions: Kenyon College, University of Innsbruck, Ohio State University

David M. Rowe is an American political scientist and the Harry M. Clor Professor of Political Science at Kenyon College where he held the R. Todd Ruppert Chair for International Studies from 2010-2012. Rowe has held the Fulbright Distinguished Chair in Humanities and Social Sciences at the University of Innsbruck. Previously he taught at Ohio State University.

== Books ==
- Manipulating the Market: Understanding Economic Sanctions, Institutional Change, and the Political Unity of White Rhodesia, University of Michigan Press 2001
