= Cyberia, London =

Former Internet café

Coordinates: 51.5201°N 0.1350°W

Cyberia
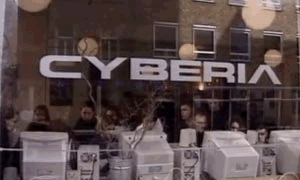
- Cyberia, London, 1994
- Industry: Internet cafe
- Founded: September 1994
- Headquarters: Whitfield Street, London, England, UK
- Key people: Eva Pascoe, Keith Teare, David Rowe, Gené Teare
- Website: www.cyberiacafe.net (now defunct)

Cyberia, London was an internet cafe founded in London in September 1994, which provided desktop computers with full internet access in a café environment. Situated at 39 Whitfield Street in Fitzrovia, the cafe was founded by Eva Pascoe, David Rowe, Keith Teare and Gené Teare, and the space served as an early hub for those with an interest in computing and the Net. Cyberia was the first internet cafe in the UK, and would soon expand into a franchise, both across the UK and worldwide.

Cyberia was intended to be a women only venture, providing a space in which women could learn and play with new technologies in their own space. "To be honest, I thought that all the boy nerds would be hooked up at home and they wouldn't need us. But we had this incredibly fast connection, and they couldn't wait to use our equipment. Actually we really liked that." After its launch, Cyberia soon became popular and settled down to a comfortable half and half, but it did host a weekly women's night to train in digital skills.

Cyberia London basement spaces were also a thriving hub of activity. Ivan Pope's Webmedia, one of the first web design and build companies, was the first tenant occupying part of the basement. Subcyberia, home to the post-rave Sunday morning breakfast club and the cafe's gamer space, was frequented with gamers 24/7 such as Richard Bartle. Transcyberia, a "semi-nerd lab room creative technology centre" for software developers and designers, played host to a range of organisations including Michael Gurstein's Community Informatics Research Network. It would see music artists passing through - Kylie Minogue held a press event at the venue, whilst David Bowie would perform a link-up through Bowienet.

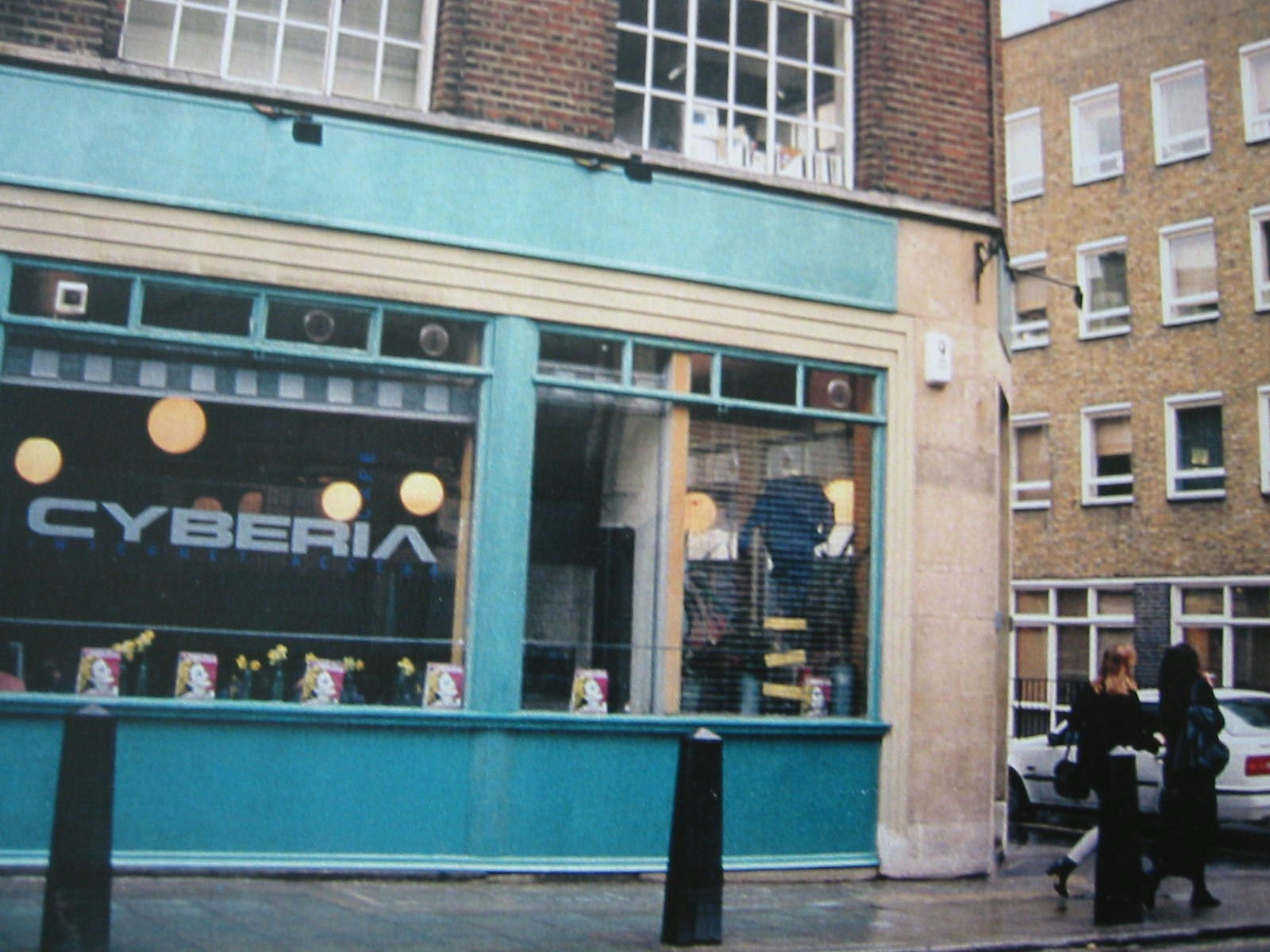
Cyberia, London, 1996

Cyberia enjoyed superfast internet access as a result of their partnership with the Easynet ISP founded by Rowe and Teare, who operated from the same building as the cafe. In turn Cyberia marketed Easynet products and services and were often the first port of call for Easynet customers looking for support for their new systems. Other early investors in Cyberia included Mick Jagger and Maurice Saatchi.

By the mid-1990s, around a dozen branches, some of which were franchises, opened both in the UK and abroad, including Manchester, Edinburgh, Dublin, Rotterdam, Bangkok, Manila, Tokyo and Paris. By 1996, some 200 cybercafes had opened around the world, emulating the success of Cyberia.

Pascoe left the business in 1998 to pursue new projects, and the Cyberia chain was sold to South Korean investors, who re-launched as the Be The Reds internet gaming cafe in 2001.

In September 2024, those connected with the original London Cyberia held a 30 years anniversary.
