= CESG Listed Adviser Scheme =

The CESG Listed Adviser Scheme was a programme run by CESG, to provide a pool of information assurance consultants to government departments and other public-sector bodies in the UK.

CLAS consultants advised on systems that handle protectively marked information, up to and including SECRET; for instance, they may have advised on GSI accreditation. CLAS consultants held a security clearance, at least SC.

CLAS consultants developed risk assessments in line with IS1, and risk management and accreditation document sets (RMADS) in line with IS2.

In 2011, entry to CLAS was closed while a replacement system was being designed.

By 2013 'new' CLAS was implemented and open for membership. 'New' CLAS required that members were CESG Certified Professionals.

CLAS was closed in January 2016.

== CESG Certified Professionals (CCP) ==
The CESG Certified Professional (CCP) scheme recognises the expertise of those working in the information assurance and cyber security arenas in both government and industry. It sets the standard for IA professionals working in this sector and provides a rigorous and independent assessment of the competence of IA professionals. CCP status is an endorsement of IA expertise and confirms that information risk in support of your business is managed in a balanced and pragmatic way.

Now that CLAS has closed, CCP is the only CESG-approved credential that applies to individual professionals rather than companies.
