= Eva Pascoe =

Polish-born entrepreneur

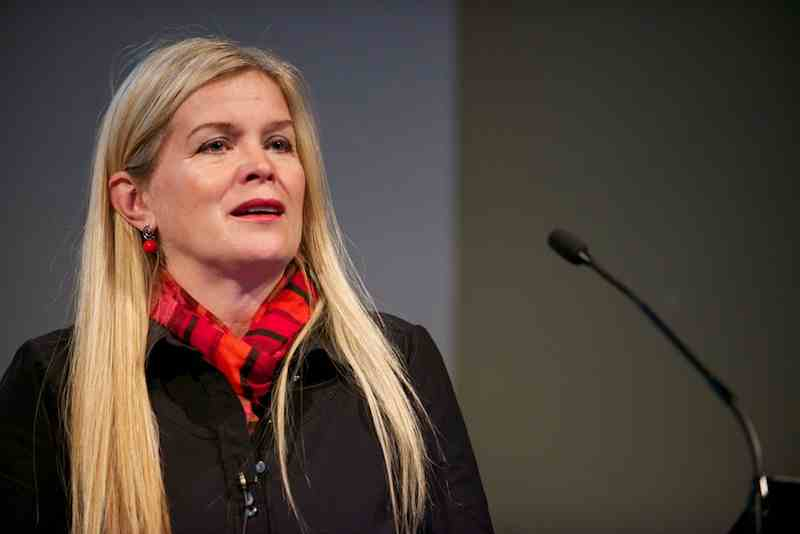
- Eva Pascoe giving a keynote speech
- Born: 1964 (age 61–62)
- Education: Birkbeck, University of London
- Occupations: Internet entrepreneur, e-commerce consultant
- Years active: 1990s–present
- Notable work: Cyberia, first internet cafe in London
- Website: https://www.evapascoe.com/

Eva Pascoe (born 1964) is a Polish-born internet entrepreneur and consultant residing in London who co-founded Britain's first internet cafe, Cyberia. She has previously written for The Independent newspaper and is a commentator on technology matters in the media and through her own blog. She was a key figure in introducing online shopping to Topshop, and has recently contributed to the Grimsey report on the future of UK High Street shopping. She also co-founded and is chair of the thinktank Cybersalon.

== Biography ==
Pascoe was born in Poland in 1964. She moved to London and studied Cognitive psychology at Birkbeck, University of London.

== Work ==
=== Cyberia ===
She co-founded Britain's first internet cafe in London called Cyberia, in September 1994.

She created the first HTML courses for the public in Cyberia and ran the first women-only courses for women interested in getting into technology. Pascoe and her co-founders were focusing on closing the gender gap in technology use as in 1994 women were less than 3% of Internet users.

=== In the media ===
Pascoe was the technical journalist for The Independent from 1995 to 2001, commentating on the increase power of the Web, growth of Network society and increasing risk of cybersecurity issues. She has also contributed to Centre for London, BBC Newsnight, whilst running her innovation website and blog since 2013 covering online retail and social media technology.

=== Mobile internet ===
Pascoe correctly predicted in 1999 that mobile phones would in the future be used for shopping and browsing on daily commutes. This included a public exchange with Alan Sugar, who disagreed with her declaring: "If I am in the office, I use my computer, while at home I use my PC. Since most of the time I am in one or other location, there is no need to receive information on a mobile phone".

=== Topshop ===
In 1999, she was invited by then CEO of Arcadia Group to set up an e-commerce team for the Topshop fashion brand. Her team developed the first e-commerce websites for fashion in UK and expanded online presence to all Arcadia brands. Pascoe became managing director of the venture Zoom which included not only building online shopping for Arcadia brands but also delivered news from Associated Newspapers.

=== Cybersalon ===
Pascoe co-founded the thinktank Cybersalon in 1997 and is their chair. Cybersalon is a not for profit organisation focusing on current affairs and the effect of digital revolution upon society, business, and culture.

=== Future High Street ===
In 2013, Pascoe was invited to join Bill Grimsey in the High Street Report, a group of experts who correctly forecast the imminent changes to the High Street, predicting move to online to eliminate need for High Street stores in UK.

The report was presented to a House of Commons Committee in September 2013.

=== Royal Society of Arts ===
Eva Pascoe was elected to the RSA Trustee Board as Fellowship Council Representative in January 2024, having previously served as a London Councillor on the RSA Fellowship Council since 2022. She has focused on improving engagement opportunities for Fellows and Young Fellows, contributed to the judging of the Catalyst Awards, and supported social enterprise initiatives within the Fellowship. With a background in technology, Pascoe has helped develop design challenge workshops with SOAS and UCL, initiated publishing projects with King's College London on artificial intelligence, policing, and climate change, and organised the RSA's first hybrid art exhibition combining a virtual reality gallery with a physical show at RSA House.
