= Harry M. Clor =

American philosopher

- Born: July 20, 1929; Springfield, Ill.
- Died: August 25, 2018 (aged 91)
- Spouse: Margaret Hyink Clor

Education
- Education: Lawrence University, University of Chicago (PhD)

Philosophical work
- Era: 21st-century philosophy
- Region: Western philosophy
- Institutions: Kenyon College

Harry M. Clor (July 20, 1929 - August 25, 2018) was an American political philosopher and distinguished professor at Kenyon College.

== Books ==
- Obscenity and Public Morality, University of Chicago Press, 1969
- Public Morality and Liberal Society: Essays on Decency, Law, and Pornography, University of Notre Dame Press, 1996
- On Moderation: Defending an Ancient Virtue in a Modern World, Baylor University Press, 2008
- Civil Disorder and Violence: Essays on Causes and Cures (ed.), Rand McNally, 1972
- The Mass Media and Modern Democracy (ed.), Rand McNally College Pub, 1974
