= MDNX =

Private telecommunications company

- Company type: Private
- Industry: Telecommunications
- Founded: 2009
- Founder: Mark Thompson, Wayne Churchill
- Headquarters: Bracknell, United Kingdom
- Number of employees: 1000
- Website: www.mdnx.com

MDNX was a private telecommunications company located in Bracknell and London. In December 2013 MDNX acquired the entire issued share capital of Easynet, a global provider of managed networking, hosting and cloud integration services, from LDC. The combined business went by the name of Easynet. Its CEO was Mark Thompson. The company was acquired by Interoute in September 2015.

MDNX's origins lie in the former Siemens service group company, 'Solution1'. Thompson and colleague Wayne Churchill joined Solution1 in 2009, and decided to set up MDNX. Within months MDNX bought out 'Solution1' along with its customer base, acquired the retail section of Viatel, gaining fibre network and hosting sites, and CI-Net with cloud and wireless capability. The new company brand launched in 2010.

In March 2012 MDNX was one of 12 companies that successfully bid for the provision of services to the UK Public Services Network.

In August 2012 MDNX acquired Octium (trading as Griffin and Iconnyx).

In December 2013 MDNX acquired Easynet.

In September 2015 Interoute announced agreement to acquire MDNX (trading as Easynet) for £402m.

On 23 February 2018, Interoute was acquired by GTT Communications for $2.3bn (€1.9bn); the acquisition closed on 31 May 2018.
