= Interoute =

British telecommunications company

- Type: Private
- Industry: Telecommunications
- Founded: 1995
- Founder: John Mittens
- Fate: Acquired by GTT Communications (2018)
- Headquarters: London, United Kingdom
- Revenue: 700 Mio € (2016)
- Number of employees: 2,400
- Website: http://www.interoute.com

Interoute Communications Ltd was a privately held telecommunications company that operated large cloud service platforms in Europe. On 23 February 2018, Interoute was acquired by GTT Communications for $2.3bn (€1.9bn); and the acquisition closed on 31 May 2018.

== Operations ==
Interoute's network was the largest privately owned Europe-wide IP clouds as of 2009, before its acquisition by GTT Communications.

Interoute had ten subsea landing stations ringing the edge of Europe, which acted as the landing point for a number of submarine cable systems, as well as providing the European link to the SEACOM cable connecting East and South Africa to Europe. Mediterranean operators Tunisie Telecom, Malta's GO and Greece's OTE link directly to the Interoute network in Italy.

== History ==
Interoute was founded in 1995 by John Mittens who also initiated the i21 pan-European network before resigning in 2000. During the collapse of the telecommunications sector in 2001 the company was restructured into its current form. Four weeks after its holding company i-21 Holdings Ltd., went into administration, Interoute Telecommunications also went by its main supplier, Alcatel. A team led by Chairman and CEO James Kinsella undertook extensive restructuring and sold its traditional telephony operations in order to concentrate exclusively on network and Internet services. A final settlement with Alcatel was reached, effective February 2003.

The core of Interoute's assets is a purpose-built network spanning the European Union. That physical infrastructure was supplemented through a series of acquisitions. Interoute acquired the Ebone portion of the KPNQwest NV network from receivers McStay Luby in July 2002. The deal transferred eight high-capacity metropolitan area networks (MANs) into Interoute's ownership, at a cost rumoured to be a fraction of the €645 million KPNQwest paid for it. In November 2002, The Daily Telegraph reported that Interoute was hit by £310 million debt. Between 2003 and 2007 Interoute acquired a number of businesses, including: Virtue Broadcasting's Media Services Division, to expand its value-added services portfolio; Central European Communications Holdings BV (CECOM) and its operating subsidiaries in Czech Republic, Slovakia, Hungary, Austria, Germany, Poland and Romania, which extended its footprint in the CEE; the European operations of hosting provider VIA NET.WORKS; and PSINet's European operations in Germany, France, Belgium, Netherlands and Switzerland; plus Managed Services businesses in Sweden and Bulgaria. More recently (Oct 2014), they acquired Vtesse Group to expand their cloud services portfolio across the UK.

In September 2015, Interoute announced plans to acquire Easynet (MDNX) for £402m.

== Acquisition by GTT ==
On 28 February 2018 GTT Communications announced the acquisition of Interoute for $2.3 billion. The acquisition closed on 31 May.

== Financial ==
A privately held company, before the purchase by GTT Communications, Interoute was owned by the Sandoz Family Foundation, one of the world's largest private family foundations as well as by Aleph Capital, an independent investment firm based in London and Crestview Partners.
