= The Abusive Hosts Blocking List =

Former internet abuse filtering system

The Abusive Hosts Blocking List (AHBL) was an internet abuse tracking and filtering system developed by The Summit Open Source Development Group, and based on the original Summit Blocking List (2000–2002). Its DNSBLs were shut down on Jan 1, 2015 and now appear to be blacklisting the entire Internet.

== DNSbl and RHSbl lists ==
The AHBL operated several DNSbl lists and one RHSbl list for use in various types of services. While the data were mostly added and removed automatically, the AHBL preferred to manage certain categories by hand for accuracy.

The DNSbl list was developed for use in SMTP services and was a real-time blocking system. This means that data were collected from various sources 24 hours a day, 7 days a week in real time, and merged into the database. The data included spam sources, open proxies, open relays, DDoS drones, Usenet spam sources, and the controversial Shoot On Sight listing policy.

The IRCbl list was a reduced version of the DNSbl that does not include spam sources or other data unnecessary for use in IRC networks and other chat systems.

The RHSbl list was domain-based rather than ip4r. It included domains owned and/or operated by spammers, known abusive domains, and domains that are not used to send e-mail (on request of the domain owner). It was commonly used to block domains in the From: address of e-mail, as well as SURBL type systems that scan the links in e-mail.

The TORbl list was an ip4r based list of Tor nodes. It included all Tor nodes, including entrance, transit, and exit nodes on the Tor network. As the list contained entrance and transit nodes, not just exit nodes, AHBL recommends against using the TORbl for e-mail blocking purposes.

AHBL was shut down on January 1, 2015.

== Controversy ==
Several of the AHBL's actions since its creation have led to harsh criticism from other members of the spam fighting community for being overly aggressive and unreasonable. One such example is the complete blocking of Spain's largest Internet service provider, Telefónica.es, for more than 6 months "because of the ever increasing amount of spam and illegal 419 coming from rima-tde.net IP space." The AHBL has also publicly spoken out against the Spamhaus .mail ICANN proposal, which was later rejected by ICANN.

The AHBL has also listed GoDaddy's hosting services due to continued hosting of The Free Speech Store (Richard Scoville, who attempted to sue the AHBL in the past). This listing was escalated after repeated attempts to resolve the issue with GoDaddy's Abuse Department, and being told "that they will not enforce their TOS or AUP unless forced to by law enforcement."

The second major source of controversy comes from the AHBL's Shoot On Sight listing policy, which is commonly used by its administrators to force ISPs to take action against entities that the AHBL considers to be abusers, and against entities that make legal or "Cart00ney" threats against the AHBL or similar organizations.

== Scoville Et Al., vs. Bruns Et Al. ==
After threatening the AHBL with a lawsuit for years, on December 17, 2005 Richard Scoville, operator of the website Free Speech Store, sued the AHBL, SOSDG, and associated individuals in Bexar County, Texas for $3.525 million US, claiming various damages, to himself, and his business. The suit was dismissed with prejudice January 6, 2006 for lack of jurisdiction.

== See also ==
- Anti-spam techniques
- E-mail spam
