= David Rowe (sociologist) =

Australian sociologist

- Education: PhD, 1986, Sociology, University of Essex; MA, 1978, Sociology, University of York; BA (Hons), 1976, Sociology, University of Nottingham
- Awards: FAHA, FASSA
- Scientific career
- Institutions: Western Sydney University; University of Bath; SOAS University of London; Beijing Foreign Studies University

David Rowe is a sociologist and Emeritus Professor of Cultural Research, Institute for Culture and Society, Western Sydney University. He is a Fellow of the Academy of the Social Sciences in Australia and of the Australian Academy of the Humanities.

== Books ==
- Popular Cultures: Rock Music, Sport and the Politics of Pleasure (1995)
- Globalization and Sport: Playing the World (co-authored, 2001)
- Sport, Culture and the Media: The Unruly Trinity (second edition, 2004)
- Sport Beyond Television: The Internet, Digital Media and the Rise of Networked Media Sport (co-authored, 2012)
- Sport, Public Broadcasting, and Cultural Citizenship: Signal Lost? (co-edited, 2014)
- Making Culture: Commercialisation, Transnationalism, and the State of ‘Nationing’ in Contemporary Australia (co-edited, 2018)
