= Brian Haberstroh =

Brian Haberstroh is a businessman in New Hampshire who once ran Distributed Mail Corporation, which distributed software used to forward e-mail for other companies.

== Spam accusations ==
Prior to 2005, Distributed Mail Corporation created a software application called "Virtual Mail Delivery Agent" to end-users which sends permission-based email to addresses supplied by Haberstroh's customers. The application allowed mass emails to get past email filters, but Haberstroh insisted it operated legally and in compliance with CAN-SPAM. He claimed Fortune 1000 companies have licensed his service, though he has not named any of them apparently due to commercial confidentiality agreements. The application basically used the user's computer into a spam distributor of mass emails.

Haberstroh said that all the recipients signed up to receive mail, yet The Spamhaus Project, claimed to have caught many messages from Haberstroh's system in "spam trap" mailboxes with unpublished addresses. Furthermore, when Linford tracked down several users, they claimed to know nothing of the software, indicating that it was installed as malware. Haberstroh denied Linford's accusations and has repeatedly attempted to have Linford's Spamhaus service correct the record. Spamhaus took him off their list of known spammers in 2007.

== Legal case ==
In 2005, Haberstroh sued one of the recipients of his messages, Jay Stuler of Columbus, Ohio. Stuler complained to Haberstroh's ISP in 2003 after being inundated with spam from Haberstroh's companies, resulting in the companies' ISPs closing down Haberstroh's accounts. Haberstroh in turn sued him for preventing his companies from sending email and thereby causing "financial harm", as well as Stuler's allegedly libeling him as a "criminal". The lawsuit known as Atriks, LLC, Distributed Mail Corporation and Brian Haberstroh v. Jay Stuler, Hillsborough County North Superior Court, Docket No. 04-C-718 has been resolved and judgment has been entered for the Plaintiffs.
