= Paul Vixie =

American internet pioneer (born 1963)

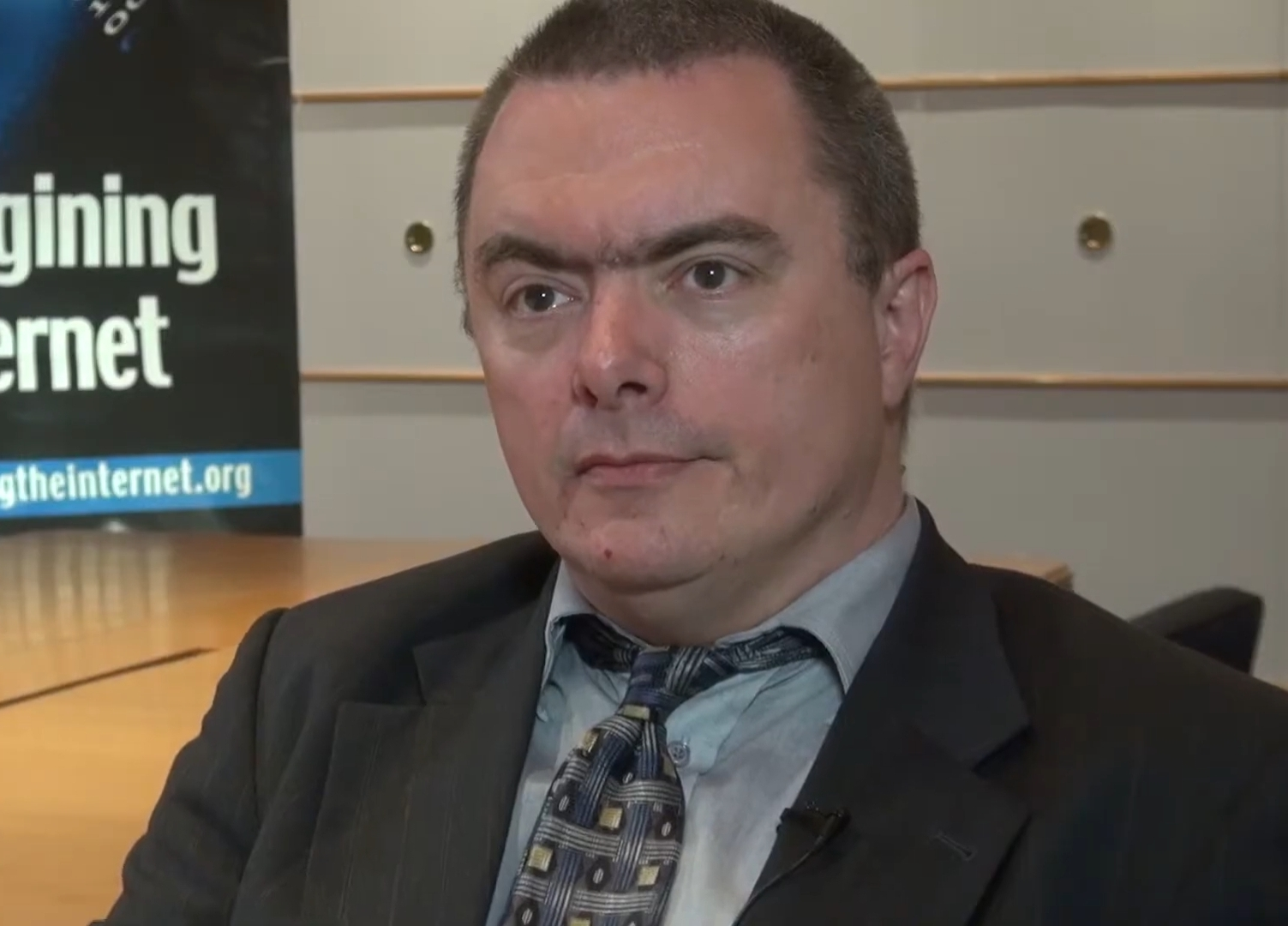
- Paul Vixie in 2014
- Born: May 23, 1963 (age 63)
- Education: Keio University
- Occupations: Vice President, Security at Amazon Web Services (AWS)
- Known for: ISC, BIND, MAPS, Vixie cron

Paul Vixie (born May 23, 1963) is an American computer scientist whose technical contributions include Domain Name System (DNS) protocol design and procedure, mechanisms to achieve operational robustness of DNS implementations, and significant contributions to open source software principles and methodology. He also created and launched the first successful commercial anti-spam service. He authored the standard UNIX system programs SENDS, proxynet, rtty and Vixie cron. At one point he ran his own consulting business, Vixie Enterprises. In 2002, Vixie held the record for "most CERT advisories due to a single author".

== Early life ==
Paul A Vixie was born on May 23, 1963 and grew up in San Francisco, and his mother's maiden name is Killian.

"There were no computers at my school. I used to cut school and go to City College of San Francisco, where they had a Honeywell system" — Paul Vixie

In 1980, when George Washington High School in San Francisco told him he'd have to repeat 11th grade, he quit school and got a job as a programmer at a consulting firm.

== Career ==
Vixie worked on BIND as a software engineer at Digital Equipment Corporation (DEC) from 1988 to 1993. After he left DEC in 1994, he founded Internet Software Consortium (ISC) in 1996 together with Rick Adams and Carl Malamud to support BIND and other software for the Internet. The activities of ISC were assumed by a new company, Internet Systems Consortium in 2004. Although ISC operates the F root name server, Vixie at one point joined the Open Root Server Network (ORSN) project and operated their L root server.

Vixie played an instrumental role in making the complete works of Shakespeare available online for the very first time. His 1992 transcriptions for The Complete Moby Shakespeare formed the basis for the "two oldest and most complete" Shakespeare sites on the Internet, the Massachusetts Institute of Technology's Complete Works and the University of Virginia's Shakespeare Resources.

In 1995 he cofounded the Palo Alto Internet Exchange (PAIX) and, after Metromedia Fiber Network (MFN) bought it in 1999, served as the chief technology officer to MFN / AboveNet and later as the president of PAIX.

In 1998 he cofounded Mail Abuse Prevention System (MAPS), a California non-profit company with the goal of stopping email abuse.

Vixie is the author of several Request for Comments (RFC)s, including a Best Current Practice document on "Classless IN-ADDR.ARPA Delegation" (BCP 20), and some Unix software. He stated in 2002 that he "now hold[s] the record for 'most CERT advisories due to a single author.'"

In 2008, Vixie served as a judge for the Mozilla Foundation's "Download Day", an attempt to set a Guinness World Record for most downloads in a single day for a new piece of software.

Vixie served on the board of trustees of the American Registry for Internet Numbers (ARIN) from 2005 to 2013, and served as chairman in 2009 and 2010. Vixie also serves on the Security and Stability Advisory Committee of ICANN.

He received a Ph.D. in computer science from Keio University in 2011.

In 2013, after nearly 20 years at ISC, he founded a new company, Farsight Security, Inc. spinning off the Security Business Unit from ISC.

In 2014, Vixie was inducted into the Internet Hall of Fame as an Innovator.

In 2021, Vixie's company FarSight Security was acquired by DomainTools. Since 2022, he has been working at AWS.

On May 1, 2026 he left AWS.

== Realizations ==
- BIND
- Vixie cron
- DHCP
- sendmail

== Works ==
- Paul Vixie. Software Engineering an essay in: Open Sources: Voices from the Open Source Revolution ISBN 1-56592-582-3
- Vixie, Paul; Avolio, Frederick M. (1995). Sendmail: Theory and Practice. Maynard, Mass: Digital Press. ISBN 978-1-55558-127-5.

== Patents ==
- US 6581090, Lindbo, Sverker; Löthberg, Peter & Vixie, Paul, "Procedure and apparatus for information transmission on the Internet", issued October 14, 1996
