= RealNames =

Defunct internet services company

- Type: Private
- Industry: Internet services
- Founded: 1996
- Founder: Keith Teare
- Defunct: 2002
- Fate: Ceased operations after termination of partnership with Microsoft
- Products: Keyword-based Internet naming system

RealNames was an internet services company founded in 1996 by Keith Teare. It developed a multilingual, keyword-based naming system for the Internet that would translate keywords typed into the address bar of Microsoft's Internet Explorer web browser to Uniform Resource Identifiers, based on the existing Domain Name System, that would access the page registered by the owner of the RealNames keyword.

In effect, to users of Internet Explorer, RealNames became a domain registry which was capable of registering names that worked without needing to belong to a top-level domain such as ".com" or ".net". RealNames and its backers expected this to be a lucrative source of income, and it raised more than $130 million of funding.

RealNames depended on its partnership with Microsoft, which offered the RealNames service on Internet Explorer. RealNames shut down operations in 2002 following a decision by Microsoft to redirect the 1 billion page views per calendar quarter that RealNames was resolving from the browser address bar into the MSN search engine. At the time of its closure, the company employed 83 people.

In 2014, Tucows purchased RealNames.com. The domain now hosts a customized e-mail service, made possible by its acquisition of Mailbank and its long list of surname domain names.

== See also ==
- Alternative DNS root
- AOL keyword
