= Spam and Open Relay Blocking System =

List of e-mail servers suspected of enabling spam

The Spam and Open Relay Blocking System
- Type: Public
- Founded: Queensland, Australia 2001
- Founder: Michelle Sullivan
- Headquarters: Sunnyvale CA, United States of America
- Area served: Worldwide
- Key people: Michelle Sullivan
- Owner: Proofpoint, Inc.
- Website: www.sorbs.net
- Footnotes; SORBS is owned by Proofpoint, Inc.

SORBS ("Spam and Open Relay Blocking System") was a list of e-mail servers suspected of sending or relaying spam (a DNS Blackhole List). It had been augmented with complementary lists that include various other classes of hosts, allowing for customized email rejection by its users.

== History ==
The SORBS DNSbl project was created in November 2001. It was maintained as a private list until 6 January 2002 when the DNSbl was officially launched to the public. The list consisted of 78,000 proxy relays and rapidly grew to over 3,000,000 alleged compromised spam relays.

In November 2009 SORBS was acquired by GFI Software, to enhance their mail filtering solutions.

In July 2011 SORBS was re-sold to Proofpoint, Inc.

On June 5, 2024 SORBS was shut down and no longer available.

== DUHL ==
SORBS added IP ranges that belong to dialup modem pools, dynamically allocated wireless, and DSL connections as well as DHCP LAN ranges by using reverse DNS PTR records, WHOIS records, and sometimes by submission from the Internet service providers (ISPs) themselves. This is called the DUHL or Dynamic User and Host List. SORBS did not automatically rescan DUHL listed hosts for updated rDNS so to remove an IP address from the DUHL the user or ISP had to request a delisting or rescan. If other blocks are scanned in the region of listings and the scan includes listed netspace, SORBS automatically removed the netspace marked as static.

Matthew Sullivan of SORBS proposed in an Internet Draft that generic reverse DNS addresses include purposing tokens such as static or dynamic, abbreviations thereof, and more. That naming scheme would have allowed end users to classify IP addresses without the need to rely on third party lists, such as the SORBS DUHL. The Internet Draft has since expired. Generally it is considered more appropriate for ISPs to simply block outgoing traffic to port 25 if they wish to prevent users from sending email directly, rather than specifying it in the reverse DNS record for the IP.

SORBS' dynamic IP list originally came from Dynablock but has been developed independently since Dynablock stopped updating in December 2003.

== Spam traps ==
IP addresses that send spam to SORBS spamtraps are added to their spam database automatically or manually. In order to prevent being blacklisted, major free email services such as Gmail, Yahoo, and Hotmail, as well as major ISPs now implement outgoing anti-spam countermeasures. Gmail, for example, continues to get listed and delisted because they refuse abuse reports. However, smaller networks may still be unwittingly blocked. Because spammers use viruses, malware, and rootkits to force compromised computers to send spam, SORBS listed the IP addresses of servers that the infected system used to send its spam. Because of this, larger ISPs and corporate networks have started blocking port 25 in order to prevent these compromised computers from being able to send email except through designated email servers.

== Preemptive listings ==
SORBS maintained a list of networks and addresses that it believed are assigned dynamically to end users/machines, it referred to this list as the DUHL (Dynamic User/Host List). The list includes wide networks of computers sharing the same IP address using network address translation which are also affected (If one computer behind the NAT is allowed to send spam, the whole network will be blacklisted if the NAT IP is ever blacklisted.) This is a common method of pre-emptive blocking as most legitimate mail servers are hosted in data centers designed and provisioned for such services, the legitimate mail servers that are affected by such listings are most commonly home hobbyists running their own mail servers. The Spamhaus Policy Block List (PBL) is another such pre-emptive list which does not just list dynamic hosts, but also blocks hosts it believes should not be sending email directly to third-party servers. SORBS also operated another list which is similar to the Spamhaus PBL called the NoServers list, which is wholly maintained by the network administrators of the respective networks and is therefore theoretically False Positive free.

== Escalated listings ==
SORBS has been accused of deliberately targeting innocent users through escalated listings. Its website describes the process as follows: "An escalated listing on the other hand is where a whole network of IP addresses is listed in SORBS and all hosts and IPs (whether assigned to a single customer or multiple) are listed and therefore blocked or result in spam folder issues. Why does SORBS create escalated listings? The simple answer is to stop spam. You ask, 'How does listing innocent IPs help stop spam?' Simple, some providers don’t care about spam." There have been many heated discussions on this practice as often it would appear that email users who are caught in this trap have no recourse, because the listing applies to a block of IP addresses, and they are unable to release their own IP address.

== False positives ==
Due to the automation of SORBS listings it was possible for the addresses of legitimate mail servers to be listed from time to time. Therefore, users of the SORBS Spam list in particular should consider carefully any such implications and may wish to use the service as part of a larger spam blocking system. The SORBS 'No Servers' list is reported to be wholly administered by the network administrators of the networks concerned therefore it should be false positive free.

== Statistics ==
SORBS produced and published daily statistics about its list to the otherwise defunct usenet newsgroup news.admin.net-abuse.bulletins (NANAB). As of 7 April 2021 statistics published showed the following listing totals:

Unique IPs in Proxy entries:             613259
Unique IPs in Relay entries:             7824
Unique IPs in Spam entries:              48515896
Unique IPs in Hacked entries:            7337019
Unique IPs in DUHL entries:              381194921
Unique IPs in exDUHL entries:            1072776
Unique IPs in Cable entries:             3877257
Unique IPs in Zombie entries:            1772805
Unique IPs in AdminRequested entries:    1
Unique IPs in UnAllocated entries:       139101
Unique IPs in CoLo entries:              136259
Unique IPs in MailServer entries:        31
Unique IPs in Spammer entries:           1
Unique IPs in Escalated entries:         2305
Unique IPs in Phishing entries:          110995
Unique IPs in Virus entries:             5630114
Unique IPs in BackScatter entries:       36
Unique IPs in Business entries:          5693190
Unique IPs in Static entries:            8906441
Unique IPs in WhiteHat entries:          1
Unique IPs in NoServers entries:         46844194
Unique IPs in CoreNetwork entries:       42588
Unique IPs in InstantReport entries:     31
Unique IPs in EmailReport entries:       1
Unique IPs in Permission entries:        81
Unique IPs in Botnet entries:            379527
Total IPs listed in the database         512276654
