= Easynet =

Managed Services Provider

- Industry: Internet service
- Founded: 1994; 32 years ago
- Founders: David Rowe, Keith Teare
- Defunct: 2015
- Fate: Acquired by Interoute
- Headquarters: London, United Kingdom

Easynet was a managed services provider which delivered integrated networks, hosting and unified communications services to organisations globally. The company was later renamed Easynet Global Services, and a sister company, Easynet Connect, was founded in 2008 which focused on providing internet access connectivity to small-to-medium size companies in the UK.

The company was headquartered in the UK, and had offices in Europe, Asia Pacific, and the US.

== History ==
Easynet was founded on 1 August 1994 by David Rowe and Keith Teare, with its office at 39 Whitfield Street, London. This was located above what would later become the UK's first internet café, Cyberia, with Easynet supplying Cyberia's internet access.

In March 1996 Easynet floated on the Alternative Investment Market (AIM) at 100 pence per share, thereby raising £2.6 million. In July 1996 Easynet acquired Pavilion, a small ISP with 1,600 subscribers, for £215,000. However, by September 1996 and just six months after the float, the share price had fallen to 38.5 pence. This was attributed at the time to bad press, general deterioration in the technology market, and increased losses.

On 23 January 2001 Easynet became the first operator in mainland UK to unbundle a local loop of copper wire from British Telecom's network and provide its own broadband service over it. Later in 2004, Easynet was the first to challenge British Telecom in the wholesale broadband market when it announced its 8 Mbit/s LLUStream service.

In June 2001 Easynet acquired Ipsaris from Marconi Communications in an all-share deal worth £300 million. Ipsaris was a network provider owning one of the largest backbones in the UK at the time, using 3,500 kilometres of optical fibre running alongside the UK canal network which had been laid by the Fibreway company in the 1990s. The deal resulted in Marconi owning a 72% stake in Easynet. However, by March 2002 demand for space on the Easynet network had slumped and Easynet effectively mothballed the Ipsaris fibre optic network. The value of the entire network was written down from £350 million to £15 million, and 90 staff members were axed in an effort to reduce costs.

In July 2003 Marconi sold 32% of its stake in Easynet for £40.5 million and in September 2003 it sold its remaining 40% stake for £56.7 million, in an effort to pay off debt and increase the liquidity in Easynet shares.

On 16 March 2004 Easynet acquired Novaxess Beheer B.V., a Dutch broadband company that had at the time unbundled 84 exchanges across the Netherlands and supplied 4,500 business customers. The deal was worth £26.2 million and was partly financed by a vendor placing of 6.35 million new shares in Easynet at a minimum price of 130 pence per share.

On 31 December 2005 the Office of Fair Trading regulator cleared the acquisition of Easynet by British Sky Broadcasting despite concerns raised by rivals. Easynet was purchased and owned by British Sky Broadcasting, from 2006 to 2010. Under Sky, much of the original innovation was lost, but the brand continued. In 2010 BSkyB sold the Easynet brands and customer base to Lloyds Development Capital (LDC), the private equity arm of Lloyds Banking Group.

In 2013 LDC sold its stake in Easynet to MDNX, backed by private equity firm Equistone Partners Europe who took a majority stake in the newly formed group. This new group would continue to trade under the Easynet brand.

In October 2015 the Easynet Group of companies was acquired by Interoute for £402 million.

== Dynablock ==
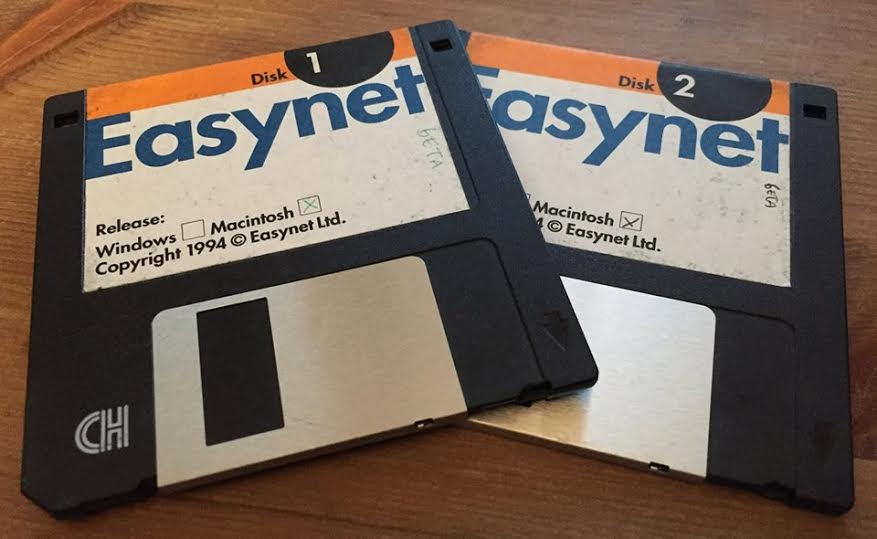
A pair of Easynet floppy discs

Dynablock, originally developed by Ben Grimm at Wirehub! Internet, acquired by Easynet in 2002, is a name which was used by Easynet from 2001 to 2003 for their Dialup Users List DNSBL of Internet addresses that appeared to be assigned dynamically, i.e. to dialup and residential broadband users. Updates of Dynablock stopped in December 2003 but it became the basis for NJABL and SORBS own dynamic IP lists. The dynamic list parts of NJABL and SORBS have been developed independently since then, with NJABL using the 'dynablock' name for their list.

In early 2007, NJABL passed their data to The Spamhaus Project, for using in their PBL service.

== Banned advertising campaign ==
Banned Easynet advert, December 2002

In 2002, a campaign created by HHCL for Easynet's broadband services showed both male and female bosses punching their employees for wasting company money, and employees punching their bosses for slow internet speeds. One of the advertisements which appeared in the London Evening Standard showed a man being punched in the face by his male boss, with the slogan: "When your MD finds out you're spending up to 85% too much on your internet connection". A second advertisement showed an image of a woman punching a man in the face with the slogan: "When your employees discover that their internet connection could be 140 times faster". The Advertising Standards Authority banned these adverts. ruling that they could cause serious or widespread offence and that they condoned violence and anti-social behaviour.
