= EstDomains =

Former website hosting provider from Estonia

EstDomains logo

EstDomains was a website hosting provider and a Delaware corporation headquartered in downtown Tartu, Estonia. EstDomains was known for hosting websites with malware, child pornography, and other illegal content. Brian Krebs of The Washington Post stated that EstDomains "appeared to be the registrar of choice for the infamous Russian Business Network." EstDomains was one of the largest domain registrars in the world. By 2007 EstDomains gained a reputation for hosting illegal content.

The CEO, Vladimir Tšaštšin (also known as "SCR"), received a prison sentence for credit card fraud, document forgery, and money laundering. His conviction occurred on 6 February 2008. On 28 October 2008, the Internet Corporation for Assigned Names and Numbers (ICANN) announced that it would revoke the accreditation of EstDomains because of the CEO's convictions; the revocation would occur on 12 November 2008. On 29 October ICANN said it would delay shutting down EstDomains, pending a review. EstDomains said that Tšaštšin had resigned in June of that year and that his conviction is on appeal, while EstDomains had not notified ICANN of the change. On 12 November 2008 ICANN announced that EstDomains would be shut down on 24 November 2008. According to ICANN, when the accreditation was terminated, EstDomains had 281,000 domain names. On Tuesday 25 November 2008 web host ResellerClub announced that it is taking over EstDomains's business.

Iain Thompson of Australian PC Authority ranked Tšaštšin as the tenth-worst technology business chief executive.

== Arrest ==
On November 9, 2011, the FBI announced the arrest of Tšaštšin and his business partners Timur Gerassimenko, Dmitri Jegorov, Valeri Aleksejev, Konstantin Poltev and Anton Ivanov in Operation Ghost Click. At the time, the seventh defendant, Andrey Taame, remained at large.

== See also ==
- Rove Digital
- Trojan.Win32.DNSChanger
