= McColo =

Defunct web hosting provider used for cybercrime

- Industry: Web hosting service
- Founded: 2004; 22 years ago in San Jose, California, United States
- Founder: Nikolai "Kolya" McColo
- Defunct: November 11, 2008
- Fate: Shutdown
- Headquarters: San Jose, California, United States
- Website: mccolo.com

Effect of McColo takedown on spam volumes, from SpamCop.

McColo was a US-based web hosting service provider that was, for a long time, the source of the majority of spam-sending activities for the entire world. In late 2008, the company was shut down by two upstream providers, Global Crossing and Hurricane Electric, because a significant amount of malware and botnets had been trafficking from the McColo servers.

== History ==
McColo was formed by a 19-year-old Russian hacker and student named Nikolai. Nikolai's nickname was "Kolya McColo"; hence the name of the provider.

== Malware traffic ==
At the time of termination of its upstream service on November 11, 2008, it was estimated that McColo customers were responsible for a substantial proportion of all email spam then flowing and subsequent reports claim a two-thirds or greater reduction in global spam volume. This reduction had been sustained for some period after the takedown. McColo was one of the leading players in the so-called "bulletproof hosting" market — ISPs that will allow servers to remain online regardless of complaints.

According to Ars Technica and other sources, upstream ISPs Global Crossing and Hurricane Electric terminated service when contacted by Brian Krebs and The Washington Post’s Security Fix blog, but multiple reports had been published by organizations including SecureWorks, FireEye and ThreatExpert, all naming McColo as the host for much of the world's botnet traffic. According to Joe Stewart, director of malware research for SecureWorks, the Mega-D, Srizbi, Pushdo, Rustock and Warezov botnets all hosted their master servers at McColo; numerous complaints had been made but McColo simply moved offending servers and sites to different subnets. Spamhaus.org reportedly finds roughly 1.5 million computers infected with either Srizbi or Rustock sending spam in an average week.

Following the shut down, details began to emerge of the ISP's other clients, which included distributors and vendors of child pornography and other criminal enterprises, including the Russian Business Network.

McColo gained reconnection briefly on November 19, 2008 via a backup connection agreement common in the industry, but was rapidly shut down again.

The McColo takedown especially affected Srizbi, one of the world's largest botnets, controlling 500,000 infected nodes as of November 2008.

Symantec's monthly state of spam report for April 2009 stated that spamming was now back to what it was before McColo was taken offline. Due to botnets being created and old ones being brought back online, it estimated that about 85 percent of all email traffic is spam. By November 2009 the IP space used by McColo was still largely unused, as much of it was unattractive to buyers due to being widely blacklisted.

== See also ==
- Botnet
- Oleg Nikolaenko, whose arrest also reduced worldwide spam
- Rustock botnet, one of the largest spambots ever built
- Zombie (computer science)
