= Business network (disambiguation) =

A business network is a complex network of companies, working together to accomplish certain goals. Other uses are:

== Specific companies ==
- Fox Business Network
- Global Business Network
- Russian Business Network

== See also ==
- Business networking
