= Derek Dunne =

Derek "Maradonna" Dunne was a former League of Ireland soccer player turned drug dealer.

== Early life ==
He grew up in Grenville Street, off Hill Street on the northside of Dublin in an area badly affected by heroin addiction.

As a teenager he played for Belvedere F.C., then moved to St Patrick's Athletic F.C. for four years as well as Dublin Bus. While playing for the latter teams he began selling heroin. When officials at Dublin Bus heard allegations that he was dealing drugs, he was dropped by them. A former manager at St Patrick's was surprised at the allegations, as Dunne had applied himself to soccer very well.

== Criminal career ==
In 1994 the North Central Divisional Drug Squad targeted him and a number of his close associates in an operation codenamed "Family Tree". He was questioned several times but never charged.

In 1995 he attacked and seriously assaulted a nephew of Gerry "the Monk" Hutch, leaving him in a coma and with a contract out for Dunne's death. Dunne paid £200,000 to the Monk to have the contract annulled. He then set up a permanent base in Liverpool.

In January 1996 he was arrested by police in Manchester following a joint operation with Gardaí and charged with conspiracy to smuggle heroin into Ireland. The initial trial collapsed over publicity involving the murder of Veronica Guerin and the second trial found him not guilty.

== Private life ==
He was in a long-term relationship with the daughter of George Mitchell and they had a daughter.

== Death ==
On June 3, 2000 he was found outside his apartment in Amsterdam lying dead on the ground by Dutch police. He was 33. An Englishman was found seriously wounded and a Dutch man in handcuffs was found with a minor injury. The Dutchman was an associate of Dunne's who was forced to help the Englishman and a Yugoslav find Dunne's home. Dunne's girlfriend answered the door to them. The newcomers had come to Dunne about a debt owned to the Yugoslav. Shots were exchanged between the newcomers and Dunne in which the latter was fatally injured.

A man from the former Yugoslavia confessed to shooting Derek Dunne, claiming self defence. Dunne had been approached for debts because three English associates of Dunne owed debts to the Yugoslav and Dunne was asked to honour the debt. Dunne had reacted angrily to their arrival, ordered them to leave and a gun battle broke out.
