= Bulletproof hosting =

Internet service for use by cyber-criminals

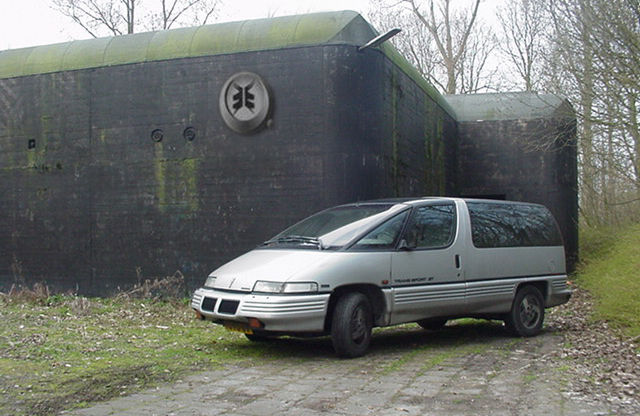
A former NATO bunker in the Netherlands, which housed bulletproof hosting provider CyberBunker.

Bulletproof hosting (BPH) is technical infrastructure service provided by an internet hosting service that is resilient to complaints of illicit activities, which serves criminal actors as a basic building block for streamlining various cyberattacks. BPH providers allow online gambling, illegal pornography, botnet command and control servers, spam, copyrighted materials, hate speech and misinformation, despite takedown court orders and law enforcement subpoenas, allowing such material in their acceptable use policies.

BPH providers usually operate in jurisdictions which have lenient laws against such conduct. Most non-BPH service providers prohibit transferring materials over their network that would be in violation of their terms of service and the local laws of the incorporated jurisdiction, and oftentimes any abuse reports would result in takedowns to avoid their autonomous system's IP address block being blacklisted by other providers and by Spamhaus.

== History ==
BPH first became the subject of research in 2006 when security researchers from VeriSign revealed the Russian Business Network, an internet service provider that hosted a phishing group, was responsible for about $150 million in phishing-related scams. RBN also become known for identity thefts, child pornography, and botnets. The following year, McColo, the web hosting provider responsible for more than 75% of global spam was shut down and de-peered by Global Crossing and Hurricane Electric after the public disclosure by then-Washington Post reporter Brian Krebs on his Security Fix blog on that newspaper.

== Difficulties ==
Since any abuse reports to the BPH will be disregarded, in most cases, the whole IP block ("netblock") assigned to the BPH's autonomous system will be blacklisted by other providers and third party spam filters. Additionally, BPH also have difficulty in finding network peering points for establishing Border Gateway Protocol sessions, since routing a BPH provider's network can affect the reputation of upstream autonomous systems and transit provider. This makes it difficult for BPH services to provide stable network connectivity, and in extreme cases, they can be completely de-peered; therefore BPH providers evade AS's reputation based fortification such as BGP Ranking and ASwatch through unconventional methodologies.

=== Web hosting reseller ===
According to a report, due to their mounting difficulties, BPH providers engage in establishing reseller relationships with lower-end hosting providers; although these providers are not complicit in supporting the illegitimate activities, they tend to be lenient on abuse reports and do not actively engage in fraud detection. Therefore, BPH conceals itself behind lower-end hosting providers, leveraging their better reputation and simultaneously operating both bulletproof and legitimate resells through the sub-allocated network blocks. However, if the BPH services are caught, providers of BPH migrate their clients to a newer internet infrastructure—newer lower-end AS, or IP space—effectively making the blacklisted IP addresses of the previous AS ephemeral; thus continuing to engage in criminal conduct by modifying the DNS server's resource records of the listening services and making it point to the newer IP addresses belonging to the current AS's IP space. Due to privacy concerns, the customary modes of contact for BPH providers include ICQ, Skype, and XMPP (or Jabber).

== Admissible abuses ==
Most BPH providers promise immunity against copyright infringement and court order takedown notices, notably Digital Millennium Copyright Act (DMCA), Electronic Commerce Directive (ECD) and law enforcement subpoenas. They also allow users to operate phishing, scams (such as high-yield investment program), botnet masters and unlicensed online pharmacy websites. In these cases, the BPH providers (known as "offshore providers") operate in jurisdictions which do not have any extradition treaty or mutual legal assistance treaty (MLAT) signed with the Five Eyes countries, particularly the United States. However, most BPH providers have a zero-tolerance policy towards child pornography and terrorism, although a few allow cold storage of such material given forbidden open-accessibility via the public internet.

Prevalent jurisdictions for incorporation and location of the data centers for BPH providers include Russia (being more permissive), Ukraine, China, Moldova, Romania, Bulgaria, Belize, Panama and the Seychelles.

== Impacts ==
BPH services act as network infrastructure providers for activities such as cybercrime and online illicit economies, and the working model of the cybercrime economies surrounds upon tool development and skill-sharing among peers. The development of exploits, such as zero-day vulnerabilities, are done by a very small community of highly-skilled actors, who encase them in convenient tools which are usually bought by low-skilled actors (known as script kiddies), who make use of BPH providers to carry out cyberattacks, usually targeting low-profile unsophisticated network services and individuals. According to a report produced by Carnegie Mellon University for the United States Department of Defense, low-profile amateur actors are also potent in causing harmful consequences, especially to small businesses, inexperienced internet users, and miniature servers.

Criminal actors also run specialized computer programs on BPH providers knowns as port scanners which scan the entire IPv4 address space for open ports, services run on those open ports, and the version of their service daemons, searching for vulnerable versions for exploitation. One such notable vulnerability scanned by the port scanners is Heartbleed, which affected millions of internet servers. Furthermore, BPH clients also host click fraud, adware (such as DollarRevenue), and money laundering recruitment sites, which lure credulous internet users into honey traps and cause financial losses to the individuals while keeping their illicit sites online, despite court orders and takedown attempts by law enforcement.

=== Counterinitiatives against BPH ===
The Spamhaus Project is an international nonprofit organization that monitors cyber threats and provides realtime blacklist reports (known as the "Badness Index") on malicious ASs, netblocks, and registrars that are involved in spam, phishing, or cybercrime activities. The Spamhaus team works closely with law enforcement agencies such as National Cyber-Forensics and Training Alliance (NCFTA) and Federal Bureau of Investigation (FBI), and the data compiled by Spamhaus is used by the majority of the ISPs, email service providers, corporations, educational institutes, governments and uplink gateways of military networks. Spamhaus publishes various data feeds that list netblocks of the criminal actors, and is designed for use by gateways, firewalls and routing equipments to filter out (or "nullroute") traffic originating from these netblocks:

- Spamhaus Don't Route Or Peer List (DROP) lists netblocks allocated by an established Regional Internet Registry (RIR) or National Internet Registry (NIR) that are used by criminal actors, and doesn't include abused IP address spaces sub-allocated netblocks of a reputable AS.
- Spamhaus Domain Block List (DBL) lists domain names with poor reputation in DNSBL format.
- Spamhaus Botnet Controller List (BCL) lists single IPv4 addresses of botnet masters.

In February 2025, the US, UK and Australia jointly sanctioned Zservers, a BPH provider based in Barnaul, Russia, along with two of its administrators. Law enforcement agencies said the company had provided bulletproof hosting, including leased IP addresses, to affiliates of the LockBit ransomware group. In November 2025 the United States, United Kingdom and Australia announced coordinated sanctions against Media Land, a BPH provider headquartered in St. Petersburg, Russia, which the Treasury said had hosted ransomware actors and criminal marketplaces. The same action designated Hypercore Ltd., a UK company that Aeza Group, a BPH provider sanctioned by the Treasury's Office of Foreign Assets Control (OFAC) on 1 July 2025, had used to shift its IP infrastructure and get around those sanctions.

== Notable closed services ==
The following are some of the notable defunct BPH providers:

- CyberBunker, taken down in September 2019.
- McColo, taken down in November 2008.
- Russian Business Network (RBN), taken down in November 2007.
- Atrivo, taken down in September 2008.
- 3FN, taken down by FTC in June 2009.
- Proxiez, taken down in May 2010.
- LOLEKHosted, taken down August 8, 2023.
- CrazyRDP, taken down November 12, 2025.

== See also ==
- Freedom Hosting
- Fast flux
- Security theater

== Bibliography ==
- McCoy, Damon; Mi, Xianghang; Wang, Xiofeng (26 June 2017). "Under the Shadow of Sunshine: Understanding and Detecting Bulletproof Hosting on Legitimate Service Provider Networks". 2017 IEEE Symposium on Security and Privacy (SP). New York University. pp. 805–823. doi:10.1109/SP.2017.32. ISBN 978-1-5090-5533-3. S2CID 1593958.
- Han, Catherine; Kumar, Deepak; Durumic, Zakir (2021). "On the Infrastructure Providers that Support Misinformation" (PDF). Stanford University. Archived (PDF) from the original on 25 August 2021.
- Konte, Maria; Feamster, Nick; Perdisci, Roberto (17 August 2015). "ASwatch: An AS Reputation System to Expose Bulletproof Hosting ASes". ACM SIGCOMM Comput. Commun. Rev. 45 (4). New York, United States: 625–638. doi:10.1145/2829988.2787494. ISSN 0146-4833.
- Leporini, Dino (2015). Architectures and protocols powering illegal content streaming over the Internet. University of Pisa. Amsterdam, Netherlands: International Broadcasting Convention. p. 7. doi:10.1049/ibc.2015.0013. ISBN 978-1-78561-185-8.
- Clayton, Richard; Moore, Tyler (22 December 2008). "The Impact of Incentives on Notice and Take-down". Managing Information Risk and the Economics of Security. Boston: Springer Publishing. pp. 199–223. doi:10.1007/978-0-387-09762-6_10. ISBN 978-0-387-09761-9.
- Kopp, Daniel; Strehle, Eric; Hohlfeld, Oliver (November 2021). "CyberBunker 2.0 - A Domain and Traffic Perspective on a Bulletproof Hoster". Proceedings of the 2021 ACM SIGSAC Conference on Computer and Communications Security. Association for Computing Machinery, Brandenburg University of Technology. pp. 2432–2434. arXiv:2109.06858. doi:10.1145/3460120.3485352. ISBN 978-1-4503-8454-4. S2CID 237503582.
- Collier, Benjamin; Hutchings, Alice (15 April 2021). "Cybercrime is (often) boring: maintaining the infrastructure of cybercrime economies". The British Journal of Criminology. 61 (5). Oxford University Press. doi:10.1093/bjc/azab026. hdl:20.500.11820/68a9a01b-f7c3-4fcb-9128-66caf04a4684.
- Bradbury, Danny (15 October 2010). "Digging up the hacking underground". Infosecurity. 7 (5): 14–17. doi:10.1016/S1754-4548(10)70084-X. ISSN 1754-4548.
- Konte, M.; Feamster, N.; Jung, J. (January 2008). "SAC 025: SSAC Advisory on Fast Flux Hosting and DNS" (PDF). Security and Stability Advisory Committee (1). Internet Corporation for Assigned Names and Numbers. Archived (PDF) from the original on 22 November 2021.
