= Jart =

Jart or JART may refer to:

- A brand of lawn darts
- Jart Armin, a computer security specialist
- Joint Aircraft Recovery and Transportation Squadron (JARTS), a British military post-crash management and aircraft transport unit
- Jarts, an alien race in The Way (novel series) by Greg Bear

== See also ==
- Jarte, a word processor
- Jaat (disambiguation)
