= Alureon =

2007 computer rootkit and trojan

Malware details
- Aliases: TDSS, TDL-4
- Type: Rootkit
- Classification: Trojan

Technical details
- Platform: Microsoft Windows

Alureon (also known as TDSS or TDL-4) is a trojan and rootkit created to steal data by intercepting a system's network traffic and searching for banking usernames and passwords, credit card data, PayPal information, social security numbers, and other sensitive user data. Following a series of customer complaints, Microsoft determined that Alureon caused a wave of BSoDs on some 32-bit Microsoft Windows systems. The update, MS10-015, triggered these crashes by breaking assumptions made by the malware author(s).

According to research conducted by Microsoft, Alureon was the second most active botnet in the second quarter of 2010.

== Description ==
The Alureon bootkit was first identified around 2007. Personal computers are usually infected when users manually download and install Trojan software. Alureon is known to have been bundled with rogue security software such as Security Essentials 2010. When the dropper is executed, it first hijacks the print spooler service (spoolsv.exe) to update the master boot record and execute a modified bootstrap routine. Then it infects low-level system drivers such as those responsible for PATA operations (atapi.sys) to install its rootkit.

Once installed, Alureon manipulates the Windows Registry to block access to Windows Task Manager, Windows Update, and the desktop. It also attempts to disable anti-virus software. Alureon has also been known to redirect search engines to commit click fraud. Google has taken steps to mitigate this for their users by scanning for malicious activity and warning users in the case of a positive detection.

The malware drew considerable public attention when a software bug in its code caused some 32-bit Windows systems to crash upon installation of security update MS10-015. The malware was using a hard-coded memory address in the kernel that changed after the installation of the hotfix. Microsoft subsequently modified the hotfix to prevent installation if an Alureon infection is present, The malware author(s) also fixed the bug in the code.

In November 2010, the press reported that the rootkit had evolved to the point that it was bypassing the mandatory kernel-mode driver signing requirement of 64-bit editions of Windows 7. It did this by subverting the master boot record, which made it particularly resistant on all systems to detection and removal by anti-virus software.

== TDL-4 ==
TDL-4 is sometimes used synonymously with Alureon and is also the name of the rootkit that runs the botnet.

It first appeared in 2008 as TDL-1 being detected by Kaspersky Lab in April 2008. Later version two appeared known as TDL-2 in early 2009. Some time after TDL-2 became known, emerged version three which was titled TDL-3. This led eventually to TDL-4.

It was often noted by journalists as "indestructible" in 2011, although it is removable with tools such as Kaspersky's TDSSKiller. It infects the master boot record of the target machine, making it harder to detect and remove. Major advancements include encrypting communications, decentralized controls using the Kad network, as well as deleting other malware.

== Removal ==
While the rootkit is generally able to avoid detection, circumstantial evidence of the infection may be found through examination of network traffic with a packet analyzer or inspection of outbound connections with a tool such as netstat. Although existing security software on a computer will occasionally report the rootkit, it often goes undetected. It may be useful to perform an offline scan of the infected system after booting an alternative operating system, such as WinPE, as the malware will attempt to prevent security software from updating. The "FixMbr" command of the Windows Recovery Console and manual replacement of "atapi.sys" could possibly be required to disable the rootkit functionality before anti-virus tools are able to find and clean an infection.

Various companies have created standalone tools which attempt to remove Alureon. Two popular tools are Microsoft Windows Defender Offline and Kaspersky TDSSKiller.

== Arrests ==
On November 9, 2011, the United States Attorney for the Southern District of New York announced charges against six Estonian nationals who were arrested by Estonian authorities and one Russian national, in conjunction with Operation Ghost Click. As of February 6, 2012, two of these individuals were extradited to New York for running a sophisticated operation that used Alureon to infect millions of computers.

== See also ==
- Bagle (computer worm)
- Botnet
- Conficker
- Gameover ZeuS
- Regin (malware)
- Rustock botnet
- Srizbi botnet
- Storm botnet
- Trojan.Win32.DNSChanger
- ZeroAccess botnet
- Zeus (malware)
- Zombie (computing)
