= Internet identity =

Internet identity may refer to:

- Online identity, a social identity that an Internet user establishes online
- Digital identity, information used by systems to represent an external agent
- Social profiling, process of constructing a social media user's profile using his or her social data
- IID (company), formerly Internet Identity
