= IID (company) =

Privately held Internet security company based in Tacoma

- Type: Private
- Industry: Internet security
- Founded: 1996
- Headquarters: Tacoma, Washington United States
- Key people: Lars Harvey (CEO), Rod Rasmussen (President and Chief Technology Officer)
- Website: www.internetidentity.com

IID, previously Internet Identity, was a privately held Internet security company based in Tacoma, Washington, United States. IID was acquired in an all-cash transaction by Infoblox on February 8, 2016. It primarily provides cyberthreat data, a platform to exchange cyberthreat data, and anti-phishing, malware and domain control security services to US federal government agencies, financial service firms, and e-commerce, social networking and Internet service provider (ISP) companies. Microsoft uses IID as a data feed for its anti-phishing software as well as a partner in their Domain Defense Program. Other customers include BECU (Boeing Employees’ Credit Union), Monster.com and Yakima Valley Credit Union.

== History ==
IID was founded in 1996 providing outsourced domain management services. In 1997, the company claims to have discovered and disabled one of the earliest phishing attacks. Since then, IID’s business has revolved around protecting companies against cyber attacks. In 2013, IID accepted its first round of institutional funding for $8 million from Bessemer Venture Partners. IID was acquired in an all-cash transaction by Infoblox on February 8, 2016.

== Products and services ==
=== ActiveTrust ===
ActiveTrust is IID’s Threat Intelligence Management System. The company claims it gets threat data from thousands of sources, and determines what data is useful to defend against cyberattacks. ActiveTrust feeds this data into Fortune 500 companies’ and U.S. government agencies’ cybersecurity appliances, leading IID to claim that ActiveTrust is the world’s largest commercial cyberthreat data exchange.

=== ActiveTrust Data ===
Provides a list of the latest malicious (or compromised) IP addresses, domains and e-mail accounts, and identifies those "bad players" the organization is connected to through its extended enterprise. ActiveTrust Data was formerly known as "ActiveKnowledge."

=== Threat Intelligence ===
IID’s Threat Intelligence team investigates, analyzes and validates threat data to identify patterns and trends, revealing ongoing attacks and future hazards. The TI team takes shared data from ActiveTrust and uses filtering and analysis to add structure and context.

=== DNS Services ===
Detects, diagnoses and mitigates DNS (Domain Name System) security and configuration issues for an organization and its Extended Enterprise. This tool reportedly helped IID identify the DNS hijacking of Twitter in December 2009. It also reportedly helped find that half of all Fortune 500 companies were infected with DNSChanger.

=== Mitigation ===
Provides anti-phishing and malware security solutions that help organizations ensure that online brands are trusted. Mitigation was formerly known as "ActiveControl" and "Power Shark."

== Industry partnerships ==
IID holds leadership positions in various security industry groups including the Anti-Phishing Working Group (APWG), Internet Corporation for Assigned Names and Numbers (ICANN) and Messaging Anti-Abuse Working Group (MAAWG).
