= Collactive =

Israeli software company

Collactive Inc.
- Type: Private
- Industry: Internet, Computer software
- Founded: December 13, 2006 (as Delaware corporation)
- Headquarters: Herzliya, Israel
- Key people: Eran Reshef, CEO; Amir Hirsh, President
- Products: "APB System", "Campaign Manager", "Collactive Web Assistant"
- Website: www.collactive.com (defunct)

Collactive Inc. was an Israel-based privately held start-up company which marketed software designed to influence ratings on sites which allow users to rate articles or other items. Collactive launched publicly in May 2007, with US$2 million in startup funding from American venture firm Sequoia Capital.

== Products ==
Collactive main product was a system designed to influence ratings on key sites which measure the popularity of items on the Internet. The system had two main components, the APB component that allows an individual to create and distribute a "call for action" webpage, and the "Web Assistant", installed on a user's computer, which helped APB participants by automating the process of logging in, voting or commenting according to the previously created APB.

== Controversy ==
Like its earlier Blue Service Team-released Blue Frog, Collactive's software was accused of being unethical.

== See also ==
- Megaphone desktop tool, an earlier version of Collactive's "Web Assistant" used for political lobbying.
- Vote-stuffing

== Press coverage ==
- "New Web 2.0 App Prompts Web 2.0 Elite To See Democracy As Spam", Wired blog entry by Ryan Singel.
- "Web Sites' Lists Of 'Most Viewed' Too Easy to Game?", Wall Street Journal.
- "Blue Frog reborn as traffic hoarder", InfoWorld
- "Collactive seeks to overwhelm Digg, Reddit with interested stories". VentureBeat. May 16, 2007.
- "Anti-spam tech reborn as web activist tool". The Register. December 18, 2006.
- "Spammer Slammer Targets Politics". Wired. December 14, 2006.
