= Akbot =

Computer virus and botnet

Malware details
- Classification: Computer virus
- Isolation date: 2008
- Origin: New Zealand
- Author: Owen Walker

Akbot was a computer virus that infected an estimated 1.3 million computers and added them to a botnet. It was created by an 18-year-old named Owen Walker, who was charged but unconvicted in 2008.

== Infection ==
Akbot is an IRC controlled backdoor program. It allows an outside user to take control of the infected computer. Akbot operates by joining IRC servers and the waiting for further instructions. Once installed, Akbot can be used to gather data, kill processes, or perform DDOS attacks.

== Sources ==
The author, 18-year-old New Zealand based bot master, Owen Walker ("AKILL"), was caught during an international investigation, Operation: Bot Roast, during which his home was raided by New Zealand police and an FBI agent. He was charged in April 2008, but not convicted because the court did not believe his motives to be criminal.
