= Rustock botnet =

Type of botnet

The Rustock botnet was a botnet that operated from around 2006 until March 2011.

It consisted of computers running Microsoft Windows, and was capable of sending up to 25,000 spam messages per hour from an infected PC. At the height of its activities, it sent an average of 192 spam messages per compromised machine per minute. Reported estimates on its size vary greatly across different sources, with claims that the botnet may have comprised anywhere between 150,000 and 2,400,000 machines. The size of the botnet was increased and maintained mostly through self-propagation, where the botnet sent many malicious e-mails intended to infect machines opening them with a trojan which would incorporate the machine into the botnet.

The botnet took a hit after the 2008 takedown of McColo, an ISP which was responsible for hosting most of the botnet's command and control servers. McColo regained Internet connectivity for several hours, and in those hours up to 15 Mbit a second of traffic was observed, likely indicating a transfer of command and control to Russia. While these actions temporarily reduced global spam levels by around 75%, the effect did not last long: spam levels increased by 60% between January and June 2009, 40% of which was attributed to the Rustock botnet.

On March 16, 2011, the botnet was taken down through what was initially reported as a coordinated effort by Internet service providers and software vendors. It was revealed the next day that the take-down, called Operation b107, was the action of Microsoft, U.S. federal law enforcement agents, FireEye, and the University of Washington.

To capture the individuals involved with the Rustock botnet, on July 18, 2011, Microsoft is offering "a monetary reward in the amount of US$250,000 for new information that results in the identification, arrest and criminal conviction of such individual(s)."

== Operations ==
Botnets are composed of infected computers used by unwitting Internet users. In order to hide its presence from the user and anti-virus software, the Rustock botnet employed rootkit technology. Once a computer was infected, it would seek contact with command-and-control servers at a number of IP addresses and any of 2,500 domains and backup domains that may direct the zombies in the botnet to perform various tasks such as sending spam or executing distributed denial of service (DDoS) attacks. Ninety-six servers were in operation at the time of the takedown. When sending spam the botnet uses TLS encryption in around 35 percent of the cases as an extra layer of protection to hide its presence. Whether detected or not, this creates additional overhead for the mail servers handling the spam. Some experts pointed out that this extra load could negatively impact the mail infrastructure of the Internet, as most of the e-mails sent these days are spam.

== See also ==
- Botnet
- Helpful worm
- McColo
- Operation: Bot Roast
- Srizbi botnet
- Zombie (computer science)
- Alureon
- Conficker
- Gameover ZeuS
- Storm botnet
- Bagle (computer worm)
- ZeroAccess botnet
- Regin (malware)
- Cyberwarfare by Russia
- Zeus (malware)
