= Megaphone desktop tool =

Pro-Israel lobbying software tool

Screenshot of Megaphone Desktop Tool

The Megaphone desktop tool was a Windows "action alert" tool developed by Give Israel Your United Support (GIYUS) and distributed by World Union of Jewish Students, World Jewish Congress, The Jewish Agency for Israel, World Zionist Organization, StandWithUs, Hasbara fellowships, HonestReporting, and other pro-Israel public relations organizations. The tool was released in July during the 2006 Lebanon War. By June 2011, the tool was no longer available through the GIYUS website. An RSS newsfeed is available.

== Software ==
The Megaphone Desktop Tool acted as a wrapper around an RSS feed from the GIYUS website. Originally, it gave the user the option of going to a particular site with a poll, and if the user chooses to go to the site, the software then casts a vote automatically, when this is technically feasible, but that feature had been discontinued.

Giyus tries to save you the time and effort of locating the voting form inside the website, a seemingly simple task that may prove quite confusing at certain sites. Whenever we technically can we direct you straight to the voting action. If you have arrived at the poll results, it means that you were directed straight to the voting action and have already successfully voted. If for some reason you don't care to vote, you can always use the "No Thanks" link in the article alert popup.

In later versions, the voting concept was removed entirely and the tool directed users to anti-Israel websites, giving users and option click a button labeled "act now!" which would direct the user to a poll or email address.

The software license provides for remote updates: "You understand and agree that Giyus.Org may provide updates, patches and/or new versions of the Software from time to time, including automatic updates that will be installed on your computer, with notice to You, as needed to continue to use the Services, and You hereby authorize such installations."

== Press coverage ==
According to The Jerusalem Post, Amir Gissin, head of the Public Affairs Department of the Foreign Ministry of Israel, has expressed support for the tool's use. "The Foreign Ministry itself is now pushing the idea, urging supporters of Israel everywhere to become cyberspace soldiers in the new battleground for Israel's image." it reports. Computing website The Register has described use of the software as "highly organised mass manipulation of technologies which are supposed to be democratising" and claimed Megaphone is "effectively a high-tech exercise in ballot-stuffing" The Register also reported that the BBC History magazine website "noticed an upsurge in voting on whether holocaust denial should be a criminal offence in Britain. But the closing date had already passed and the result had already been published, so the votes were invalid anyway." Stewart Purvis, former editor-in-chief of ITN, has noted that an independent panel reviewing the BBC's Israeli-Palestinian coverage received a large number of letters from North America which accused the BBC of being anti-Israeli. He states there was evidence of "pressure group involvement".

== Commercialization ==
Following the success of the Megaphone tool, the developers formed the company Collactive. In 2007, Collactive released their "Web Assistant", a general-purpose commercial version of the Megaphone tool.

== Reception ==
The tool has received a wide range of reactions, from praise to criticism. Amir Gissin, head of the Public Affairs Department of the Israeli Foreign Ministry, praised the tool, noting its efficacy during the Adnan Hajj photographs controversy in obtaining an admission from the Reuters news agency that a photograph by Adnan Hajj had been improperly edited with photo editing software. The tool has similarly been praised by a number of pro-Israel organizations for helping to fight what they perceive to be anti-Israel media bias. At the same time, it has been criticized by Independent Television News, and others for stuffing the ballot of online polls, generating excessive comments and 'spam' on internet message boards, and stifling online discussion and what is seen by some as a mass, participatory form of propaganda.

== Present ==
As of June 2011, the Megaphone Desktop Tool was unavailable for download from the creators website. Currently, alerts are displayed only through the GIYUS website RSS feed.

== See also ==
- Act.IL
- Internet activism
- Hasbara
- Media coverage of the Arab–Israeli conflict
- Arab–Israeli conflict
- Watchdog journalism
- Media bias
- HonestReporting
- Committee for Accuracy in Middle East Reporting in America
- 50 Cent Party
