= Exclu =

Encrypted messaging app

Exclu was an encrypted messaging app that was shut down after a series of international raids in February 2023.

== Service ==
Exclu offered licences for three or six months, for €500 and €900 respectively.

== History ==
In 2019 German police raided CyberBunker, which led to them obtaining data needed to decrypt the Exclu services. Data was shared with other police forces.

On 3 February 2023 simultaneous raids took place on properties in Germany, the Netherlands, Poland and Belgium. 48 people were arrested, including administrators, developers and users of Exclu.

Dutch police said that arrests were based on two distinct operations. The first, called 26Sambar, started in September 2020 and targeted owners and managers of Exclu. They were suspected of facilitating criminals. The second, called 26Lytham, began in late April 2022. This specifically targeted users suspected of being involved in organised crime.

In February 2023 German police announced that George Mitchell and Kacper Gazda where two of the five major suspects behind the network.
