= Leo Kuvayev =

- Born: Leonid Aleksandrovitch Kuvayev; 13 May 1972 (age 54)
- Other name: Alex Rodrigez

Leonid Aleksandrovitch Kuvayev (born 13 May 1972), who usually goes by the name of Leo, is a Russian/American spammer and convicted child molester believed to have been the ringleader of one of the world's biggest spam gangs. In 2005, he and six business partners were fined $37 million as a result of a lawsuit brought by the Massachusetts attorney general. It was found that they were responsible for millions of unsolicited e-mails per day. According to Spamhaus he could be the "Pharmamaster" spammer who performed a denial-of-service attack (DDoS) against the BlueSecurity company. Kuvayev is also behind countless phishing and money mule recruiting sites hosted on botnets. He has been called a "spam czar", and a "virtual criminal".

Kuvayev has registered domains with registrars operating in China, New Zealand, and France. Most of his actual web pages have been hosted in China. It is suspected by some information security professionals that Kuvayev may have been involved in the operation and control of the Storm botnet.

As of 1 June 2011, Kuvayev had confessed to sex crimes, sexually molesting girls as young as 13 years of age using the basement of his office in Moscow as a "dungeon". Kuvayev allegedly targeted vulnerable youngsters from children's homes, some of whom had mental or learning disabilities. Reports indicated that Kuvayev could face up to 20 years in prison for each offence.

On 23 March 2012, a court in Moscow found Kuvayev guilty of sexual molestation charges. On 29 March 2012, he was sentenced to 20 years in prison.

== See also ==
- Sanford Wallace
- Oleg Nikolaenko
- List of spammers
