= Rove Digital =

Former Estonia information technology company

Rove Digital was an Estonian IT company which gained fame as a producer of copious amounts of spam, and as a major distributor of trojans.

Rove Digital is named #2 of "Top 10 Worst Spammers". In a PC & Tech Authority article, Rove Digital's CEO, Vladimir Tšaštšin, was ranked at 10 on a list of the Top 10 worst chief executives, for his work at EstDomains.

On 15 February 2012, the court of Harju County, in Estonia, refused to block the extradition to the United States of four Estonian nationals charged in connection with "Operation Ghost Click": Timur Gerassimov, Dmitri Jegorov, Vladimir Tšaštšin, and Konstantin Poltev. The same court had previously refused to block the extradition of the two other Estonians charged in the case, Anton Ivanov and Valeri Aleksejev. Those defendants appealed the court's ruling on the basis that the U.S. lacked jurisdiction, because the crimes were committed in Estonia. Prosecutors countered that the crimes were committed against American businesses and institutions, citing as an example US$60,000 in costs incurred by NASA.

Gerassimov, Jegorov and Poltev were sentenced to jail for 40 and 44 months by US court

== See also ==
- EstDomains
- Trojan.Win32.DNSChanger
