= Shane Atkinson =

Shane Atkinson may refer to:

- Shane Atkinson (spammer)
- Shane Atkinson (director)
- Shane Atkinson (imam)
