= Owen Walker =

- Other name: AKILL
- Occupation: Hacker
- Known for: Akbot

Owen Thor Walker (online pseudonym AKILL) is a computer hacker living in New Zealand, who was discharged without conviction despite pleading guilty to several charges of 'cybercrime'. In 2008 he admitted to being the ringleader of an international hacking organization estimated to have caused $26 million worth of damage.

== History ==
Walker was home-schooled from the age of 13. He received no formal computer training, instead teaching himself programming and encryption. He had been diagnosed with Asperger's syndrome.

== Arrest ==
Walker was arrested under sections 248-252 of New Zealand's Crime Act after international investigations by the FBI found him to be involved in an attack on the computer network of the University of Pennsylvania. The attack was orchestrated via a botnet established by Walker, using servers he exploited and rented, the majority of which were located in Malaysia.

== Trial ==
He pleaded guilty to his connection in the crime, was fined for the cost of the damage to the University of Pennsylvania computer and was discharged without conviction, the presiding judge concluded that a conviction would only harm his future.

== Employment ==
In 2008 he was hired by TelstraClear, the New Zealand subsidiary of Australian telecommunications company Telstra, to work with their security division DMZGlobal. As a security consultant, he presented seminars and appeared in advertising. TelstraClear spokesman Chris Mirams said it was not the equivalent of hiring a bank robber to advise on bank security.
