= DollarRevenue =

Adware program

DollarRevenue is an adware program made by the company of the same name. It displays advertisements on the infected PC and installs the UCMore Toolbar to track internet searches. It usually comes bundled with another program.

In December 2007, the Dutch government agency OPTA fined two unnamed individuals and three companies 1 million euro for infecting 22 million computers worldwide.

In June 2013, The Dutch corporate appeals court (CBb) has overturned around 1 million euro worth of fines imposed by Opta on DollarRevenue. The CBb said Opta did not adequately establish what happened on the infected PCs.
