= George Mitchell (criminal) =

Irish criminal

George Mitchell, nicknamed The Penguin, is an Irish criminal originally from Drimnagh. He had an older brother Patrick, who died in January 2020. He is a cousin of Gay Mitchell and Jim Mitchell.

== Criminal history ==
=== Early criminal history ===
He started as a driver for Jacob's but got involved in robberies with associates of Martin Cahill.

=== Illicit drug dealing ===
In 1988 he was convicted of stealing a large amount of cattle drench and jailed for five years. While in prison he became interested in the illegal drug trade and within a few years of his release he was the largest supplier of illicit drugs in the country.

In the 1990s he was arrested in Luton by British police while in the possession of £575,000, a downpayment for drugs. The money was seized but Mitchell was released. In 1995, the Garda drug squad raided a house in Lucan, Dublin and discovered an ecstasy processing plant believed to have been set up by Mitchell. In 1996 his associate Johnny Doran was caught with £500,000 worth of cannabis at M50 at Castleknock. His gunman Michael Boyle was caught after a botched murder attempt in London, leaving him feeling vulnerable. Concerned that the Gardaí were focusing on him, he moved the centre of his operations to Amsterdam.

=== Lorry hijacking ===
Mitchell was arrested by Dutch police after £5 million worth of I.T. equipment originating from Hewlett Packard in Kildare was stolen from a lorry near Schiphol Airport in March 1998, and was later sentenced to 30 months in prison after Dutch authorities ruled he was the ringleader in the robbery. Mitchell had claimed in court that he was the victim of a "set up" by Irish police, who had tipped off Dutch authorities about the robbery, after he had refused to become an informant.

=== Encrypted phone business ===
In 2015 Mitchell approached Herman-Johan Xennt about setting up an encrypted phone business. Mitchell had known Xennt since at least 1998, when Mitchell was arrested for handling stolen computer parts. (Xennt has been accused of buying stolen computer parts from Mitchell). It was also claimed during a 2020 German court case that Mitchell loaned Xennt the equivalent of €700,000 in 1995 to buy a 20,000-square-foot (1,900 m^{2}) former NATO bunker on the outskirts of the southern Netherlands town of Kloetinge, which was then used to host the CyberBunker ISP.

=== Links to Hutch and Kinahan gangs ===
He has had links with the gangs led by Christy Kinahan and Gerry Hutch but after the Regency Hotel attack he made it clear to the Kinahan gang that he did not want to be dragged into their feud.

=== Exclu network ===
In February 2023 German police announced that he was one of five major suspects behind the Exclu network.
