= SpamCop =

Email spam reporting service

- Type: Subsidiary
- Founded: 1998; 28 years ago
- Founder: Julian Haight
- Parent: IronPort Systems (2003–2007); Cisco Systems (from 2007)
- Website: spamcop.net

SpamCop is an email spam reporting service, allowing recipients of unsolicited bulk or commercial email to report IP addresses found by SpamCop's analysis to be senders of the spam to the abuse reporting addresses of those IP addresses. SpamCop uses these reports to compile a list of computers sending spam called the "SpamCop Blocking List" or "SpamCop Blacklist" (SCBL).

== History ==
SpamCop was founded by Julian Haight in 1998 as an individual effort. As the reporting service became more popular, staff were added and the SCBL became more useful. It has commonly been the target of DDoS attacks and lawsuits from organizations listed in the SCBL.

Email security company IronPort Systems announced its acquisition of SpamCop on November 24, 2003, but it remained independently run by Julian Haight. A small staff and volunteer help in its forum.

IronPort agreed to become a division of Cisco Systems on January 4, 2007, effectively making SpamCop a Cisco service. Julian Haight left approximately two years after the Cisco acquisition.

SpamCop views itself as an attempt to stop spam without the necessity of governmental intervention, but because it lacks the power of a government or large ISP, it may have greater difficulty dealing with spammers' expertise as well as the large bot networks that they control and that they used to cripple Blue Security with a massive DDoS attack.

SpamCop previously provided paid email accounts through Corporate Email Services (CES). On August 9, 2014, in an email to email account holders, CES announced that "[a]s of September 30, 2014 (Tuesday) 6pm ET, the current SpamCop Email service will be converted to email forwarding-only with spam filtered by SpamCop for all existing SpamCop Email users" and that "SpamCop will no longer provide IMAP or POP service [after that date]."

As of 10:31:56 UTC on 31 January 2021, the domain and all sub-domains of spamcop.net resolved to a domain parking service due to the domain being expired. Later that day the domain was renewed and the service was again running. The outage resulted in messages being rejected due to the blacklist DNS entries all directing to the domain parking service.

== See also ==
- Anti-spam techniques § Reporting spam
- Blue Frog
- E-mail spam
- List poisoning
- Sam Spade (software)
- Spam (electronic)
- The Spamhaus Project
