= Russian Business Network =

Russian ISP openly engaged in criminal activities

The Russian Business Network (commonly abbreviated as RBN) is a multi-faceted cybercrime organization, specializing in and in some cases monopolizing personal identity theft for resale. It is the originator of the PHP-based malware kit MPack and an alleged operator of the now defunct Storm botnet.

The RBN, which is notorious for its hosting of illegal and dubious businesses, originated as an Internet service provider for child pornography, phishing, spam, and malware distribution physically based in St. Petersburg, Russia. By 2007, it developed partner and affiliate marketing techniques in many countries to provide a method for organized crime to target victims internationally.

== Activities ==
According to internet security company VeriSign, RBN was registered as an Internet site in 2006.

Initially, much of its activity was legitimate. But apparently the founders soon discovered that it was more profitable to host illegitimate activities and started hiring its services to criminals.

The RBN has been described by VeriSign as "the baddest of the bad". It offers web hosting services and Internet access to a wide range of criminal and objectionable activities, with individual activities earning up to $150 million in one year. Businesses that take active stands against such attacks are sometimes targeted by denial of service attacks originating in the RBN network. RBN has been known to sell its services to these operations for $600 per month.

The business is difficult to trace. It is not a registered company, and its domains are registered to anonymous addresses. Its owners are known only by nicknames. It does not advertise, and trades only in untraceable electronic transactions.

One increasingly known activity of the RBN is delivery of exploits through fake anti-spyware and anti-malware, for the purposes of PC hijacking and personal identity theft. McAfee SiteAdvisor tested 279 “bad” downloads from malwarealarm.com, mentioned in the Dancho Danchev referenced article, and found that MalwareAlarm is an update of the fake anti-spyware Malware Wiper. The user is enticed to use a “free download” to test for spyware or malware on their PC; MalwareAlarm then displays a warning message of problems on the PC to persuade the unwary web site visitor to purchase the paid version. In addition to MalwareAlarm, numerous instances of rogue software are linked to and hosted by the RBN.

According to a since closed Spamhaus report, RBN is “Among the world's worst spammer, malware, phishing and cybercrime hosting networks. Provides 'bulletproof hosting', but is probably involved in the crime too”. Another Spamhaus report states, "Endless Russian/Ukrainian funded cybercrime hosting [at this network]." October 13, 2007, RBN was the subject of a Washington Post article, in which Symantec and other security firms claim RBN provides hosting for many illegal activities, including identity theft and phishing.

== Routing operations ==
The RBN operates (or operated) on numerous Internet Service Provider (ISP) networks worldwide and resides (resided) on specific IP addresses, some of which have Spamhaus blocklist reports.

== Political connections ==
It has been alleged that the RBN's leader and creator, a 24-year-old known as Flyman, is the nephew of a powerful and well-connected Russian politician. Flyman is alleged to have turned the RBN towards its criminal users. In light of this, it is entirely possible that past cyber-terrorism activities, such as the denial of service attacks on Georgia and Azerbaijan in August 2008, may have been co-ordinated by or out-sourced to such an organization. Although this is currently unproven, intelligence estimates suggest this may be the case.

== See also ==
- List of spammers
- Russian Mafia
- Cyberwarfare in Russia
