= Operation: Bot Roast =

FBI operation targeting botnet operators

Operation: Bot Roast is an operation by the FBI to track down bot herders, crackers, or virus coders who install malicious software on computers through the Internet without the owners' knowledge, which turns the computer into a zombie computer that then sends out spam to other computers from the compromised computer, making a botnet or network of bot infected computers. The operation was launched because the vast scale of botnet resources poses a threat to national security.

The operation was created to disrupt and disassemble bot herders. In June 2007, the FBI had identified about 1 million computers that were compromised, leading to the arrest of the persons responsible for creating the malware. In the process, owners of infected computers were notified, many of whom were unaware of the exploitation.

Some early results of the operation include charges against the following:

1. Robert Matthew Bentley (known as "lsdigital") of Panama City Florida, pleaded guilty to charges of computer fraud and conspiracy to commit computer fraud for using botnets to install advertising software.
2. Robert Alan Soloway of Seattle, Washington, pleaded guilty to charges of using botnets to send tens of millions of spam messages touting his website.
3. Jeanson James Ancheta pleaded guilty to controlling thousands of infected computers.
4. Jason Michael Downey (known as "Nessun"), founder of the IRC network Rizon, is charged with using botnets to disable other systems.
5. Akbot author Owen Walker (known as "AKILL") of New Zealand, was tried for various crimes and discharged by the prosecution in 2008.
