= Spamming =

Unsolicited electronic messages, especially advertisements

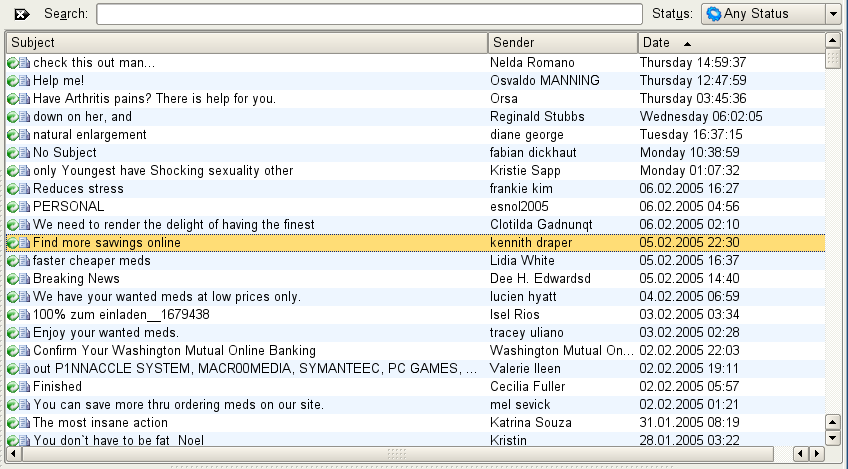
An email inbox containing a large amount of spam messages

Spamming is the use of messaging systems to send multiple unsolicited messages (spam) to large numbers of recipients for the purpose of commercial advertising, non-commercial proselytizing, or any prohibited purpose (especially phishing). It can also be repeatedly sending the same message to the same user. The most widely recognized form of spam is email spam.

Similar abuses also occur in other media: instant messaging, Usenet newsgroup, Web search engines, blogs, wiki, online classified ads, mobile phone messaging, Internet forum, fax transmissions, social spam, mobile apps, television advertising, and file sharing. It is named after Spam, a luncheon meat, by way of a Monty Python sketch about a restaurant that has Spam in almost every dish, in which Vikings annoyingly sing "Spam" repeatedly.

Spamming remains economically viable because advertisers have no operating costs beyond the management of their mailing lists, servers, infrastructures, IP ranges, and domain names, and it is difficult to hold senders accountable for their mass mailings. The costs, such as lost productivity and fraud, are borne by the public and by Internet service providers, which have added extra capacity to cope with the volume. Spamming has been the subject of legislation in many jurisdictions.

A person who creates spam is called a spammer.

== Etymology ==
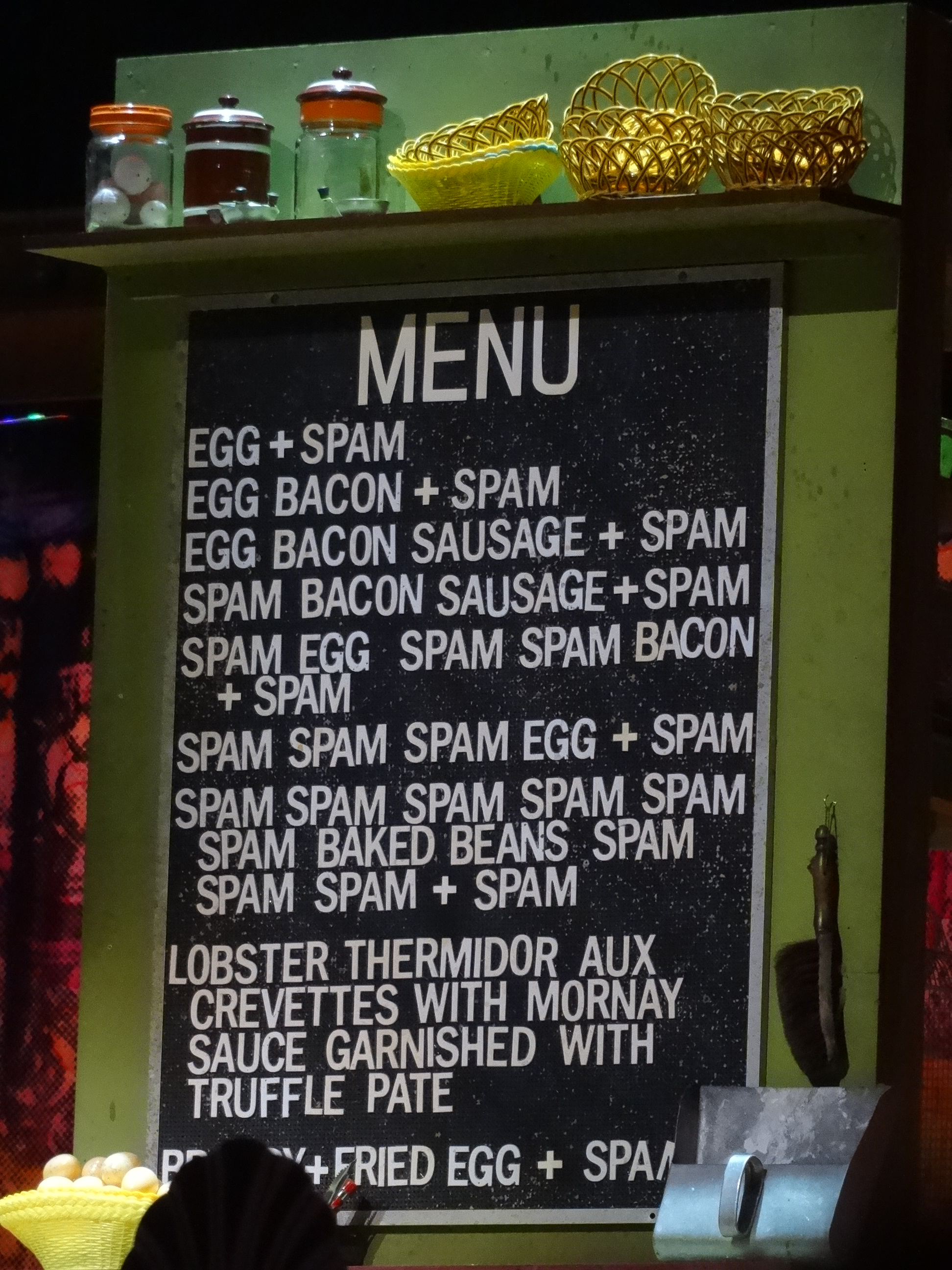
Menu from a 2014 stage performance of Monty Python's 1970 "Spam" sketch, from where the term is derived. Spam is included in almost every dish to the annoyance and dismay of a customer.

The term spam is derived from the 1970 "Spam" sketch of the BBC sketch comedy television series Monty Python's Flying Circus. The sketch, set in a cafe, has a waitress reading out a menu where every item but one includes the Spam canned luncheon meat. As the waitress recites the Spam-filled menu, a chorus of Viking patrons drown out all conversations with a song, repeating "Spam, Spam, Spam, Spam… Lovely Spam! Wonderful Spam!".

In the 1980s the term was adopted to describe certain abusive users who frequented BBSs and MUDs, who would repeat "Spam" a huge number of times to scroll other users' text off the screen. In early chat-room services and usenetgroups like AOL, they actually flooded the screen with quotes from the Monty Python sketch. This was used as a tactic by insiders of a group that wanted to drive newcomers out of the room so the usual conversation could continue. It was also used to prevent members of rival groups from chatting—for instance, Star Wars fans often invaded Star Trek chat rooms, filling the space with blocks of text until the Star Trek fans left.

It later came to be used on Usenet to mean excessive multiple posting—the repeated posting of the same message. The unwanted message would appear in many, if not all newsgroups, just as Spam appeared in all the menu items in the Monty Python sketch. One of the earliest people to use "spam" in this sense was Joel Furr. This use had also become established—to "spam" Usenet was to flood newsgroups with junk messages. In 1998, the New Oxford Dictionary of English, which had previously only defined "spam" in relation to the trademarked food product, added a second definition to its entry for "spam": "Irrelevant or inappropriate messages sent on the Internet to a large number of newsgroups or users."

There was also an effort to differentiate between types of newsgroup spam. Messages that were crossposted to too many newsgroups at once, as opposed to those that were posted too frequently, were called "velveeta" (after a cheese product), but this term did not persist.

== History ==
=== Pre-Internet ===
In the late 19th century, Western Union allowed telegraphic messages on its network to be sent to multiple destinations. The first recorded instance of a mass unsolicited commercial telegram is from May 1864, when some British politicians received an unsolicited telegram advertising a dentist.

=== History ===
The earliest documented spam (although the term had not yet been coined) was a message advertising the availability of a new model of Digital Equipment Corporation computers sent by Gary Thuerk to 393 recipients on ARPANET on May 3, 1978. Rather than send a separate message to each person, which was the standard practice at the time, he had an assistant, Carl Gartley, write a single mass email. Reaction from the net community was fiercely negative, but the spam did generate some sales.

Spamming had been practiced as a prank by participants in multi-user dungeon games, to fill their rivals accounts with unwanted electronic junk.

The first major commercial spam incident started on March 5, 1994, when a husband and wife team of lawyers, Laurence Canter and Martha Siegel, began using bulk Usenet posting to advertise immigration law services. The incident was commonly termed the "Green Card spam", after the subject line of the postings. Defiant in the face of widespread condemnation, the attorneys claimed their detractors were hypocrites or "zealots", claimed they had a free speech right to send unwanted commercial messages, and labeled their opponents "anti-commerce radicals". The couple wrote a controversial book entitled How to Make a Fortune on the Information Superhighway.

Within a few years, the focus of spamming (and anti-spam efforts) moved chiefly to email, where it remains today. By 1999, Khan C. Smith, a well known hacker at the time, had begun to commercialize the bulk email industry and rallied thousands into the business by building more friendly bulk email software and providing internet access illegally hacked from major ISPs such as Earthlink and Botnets.

By 2009 the majority of spam sent around the World was in the English language; spammers began using automatic translation services to send spam in other languages.

== In different media ==
=== Email ===
Email spam, also known as unsolicited bulk email (UBE), or junk mail, is the practice of sending unwanted email messages, frequently with commercial content, in large quantities. Spam in email started to become a problem when the Internet was opened for commercial use in the mid-1990s. It grew exponentially over the following years, and by 2007 it constituted about 80% to 85% of all e-mail, by a conservative estimate. Pressure to make email spam illegal has resulted in legislation in some jurisdictions, but less so in others. The efforts taken by governing bodies, security systems and email service providers seem to be helping to reduce the volume of email spam. According to "2014 Internet Security Threat Report, Volume 19" published by Symantec Corporation, spam volume dropped to 66% of all email traffic.

An industry of email address harvesting is dedicated to collecting email addresses and selling compiled databases. Some of these address-harvesting approaches rely on users not reading the fine print of agreements, resulting in their agreeing to send messages indiscriminately to their contacts. This is a common approach in social networking spam such as that generated by the social networking site Quechup.

=== Instant messaging ===
Instant messaging spam makes use of instant messaging systems. Although less prevalent than its e-mail counterpart, according to a report from Ferris Research, 500 million spam IMs were sent in 2003, twice the level of 2002.

=== Newsgroup and forum ===
Newsgroup spam is a type of spam where the targets are Usenet newsgroups. Spamming of Usenet newsgroups actually pre-dates e-mail spam. Usenet convention defines spamming as excessive multiple posting, that is, the repeated posting of a message (or substantially similar messages). The prevalence of Usenet spam led to the development of the Breidbart Index as an objective measure of a message's "spamminess".

Forum spam is the creation of advertising messages on Internet forums. It is generally done by automated spambots. Most forum spam consists of links to external sites, with the dual goals of increasing search engine visibility in highly competitive areas such as weight loss, pharmaceuticals, gambling, pornography, real estate or loans, and generating more traffic for these commercial websites. Some of these links contain code to track the spambot's identity; if a sale goes through, the spammer behind the spambot earns a commission.

=== Mobile phone ===
Mobile phone spam is directed at the text messaging service of a mobile phone. This can be especially irritating to customers not only for the inconvenience, but also because of the fee they may be charged per text message received in some markets. To comply with CAN-SPAM regulations in the US, SMS messages now must provide options of HELP and STOP, the latter to end communication with the advertiser via SMS altogether.

Despite the high number of phone users, there has not been so much phone spam, because there is a charge for sending SMS. Recently, there are also observations of mobile phone spam delivered via browser push notifications. These can be a result of allowing websites which are malicious or delivering malicious ads to send a user notifications.

=== Social networking spam ===
Facebook and Twitter are not immune to messages containing spam links. Spammers hack into accounts and send false links under the guise of a user's trusted contacts such as friends and family. As for Twitter, spammers gain credibility by following verified accounts such as that of Lady Gaga; when that account owner follows the spammer back, it legitimizes the spammer. Twitter has studied what interest structures allow their users to receive interesting tweets and avoid spam, despite the site using the broadcast model, in which all tweets from a user are broadcast to all followers of the user. Spammers, out of malicious intent, post either unwanted (or irrelevant) information or spread misinformation on social media platforms.

=== Social spam ===
Spreading beyond the centrally managed social networking platforms, user-generated content increasingly appears on business, government, and nonprofit websites worldwide. Fake accounts and comments planted by computers programmed to issue social spam can infiltrate these websites.

=== Blog, wiki, and guestbook ===
Blog spam is spamming on weblogs. In 2003, this type of spam took advantage of the open nature of comments in the blogging software Movable Type by repeatedly placing comments to various blog posts that provided nothing more than a link to the spammer's commercial web site. Similar attacks are often performed against wikis and guestbooks, both of which accept user contributions. Another possible form of spam in blogs is the spamming of a certain tag on websites such as Tumblr.

=== Spam targeting video sharing sites ===
Screenshot from a spam video on YouTube falsely claiming that the film in question has been deleted and can only be accessed through the link in the description. (If the video were actually removed by YouTube, neither the content nor description would be accessible.)

In actual video spam, the uploaded video is given a name and description with a popular figure or event that is likely to draw attention, or within the video a certain image is timed to come up as the video's thumbnail image to mislead the viewer, such as a still image from a feature film, purporting to be a part-by-part piece of a movie being pirated, e.g. Big Buck Bunny Full Movie Online - Part 1/10 HD, a link to a supposed keygen, trainer, ISO file for a video game, or something similar. The actual content of the video ends up being totally unrelated, a Rickroll, offensive, or simply on-screen text of a link to the site being promoted. In some cases, the link in question may lead to an online survey site, a password-protected archive file with instructions leading to the aforementioned survey (though the survey, and the archive file itself, is worthless and does not contain the file in question at all), or even malware. Others may upload videos presented in an infomercial-like format selling their product which feature actors and paid testimonials, though the promoted product or service is of dubious quality and would likely not pass the scrutiny of a standards and practices department at a television station or cable network.

=== VoIP spam ===
VoIP spam is VoIP (Voice over Internet Protocol) spam, usually using SIP (Session Initiation Protocol). This is nearly identical to telemarketing calls over traditional phone lines. When the user chooses to receive the spam call, a pre-recorded spam message or advertisement is usually played back. This is generally easier for the spammer as VoIP services are cheap and easy to anonymize over the Internet, and there are many options for sending mass number of calls from a single location. Accounts or IP addresses being used for VoIP spam can usually be identified by a large number of outgoing calls, low call completion and short call length.

=== Academic search ===
Academic search engines enable researchers to find academic literature and are used to obtain citation data for calculating author-level metrics. Researchers from the University of California, Berkeley and OvGU demonstrated that most (web-based) academic search engines, especially Google Scholar are not capable of identifying spam attacks. The researchers manipulated the citation counts of articles, and managed to make Google Scholar index complete fake articles, some containing advertising.

=== Mobile apps ===
Spamming in mobile app stores include (i) apps that were automatically generated and as a result do not have any specific functionality or a meaningful description; (ii) multiple instances of the same app being published to obtain increased visibility in the app market; and (iii) apps that make excessive use of unrelated keywords to attract users through unintended searches.

=== Bluetooth ===
Bluetooth spamming, also known as "bluejacking" or Bluetooth Low Energy spam, is the act of sending unsolicited messages, pairing requests, or data to nearby Bluetooth-enabled devices without the consent. This is generally an annoyance, but can precede to more serious attacks like data theft (bluesnarfing) or taking control of a device (bluebugging).

== Noncommercial forms ==
E-mail and other forms of spamming have been used for purposes other than advertisements. Many early Usenet spams were religious or political. Serdar Argic, for instance, spammed Usenet with historical revisionist screeds. A number of evangelists have spammed Usenet and e-mail media with preaching messages. A growing number of criminals are also using spam to perpetrate various sorts of fraud. (Note: See: Advance fee fraud)

== Geographical origins ==
In 2011 the origins of spam were analyzed by Cisco Systems. They provided a report that shows spam volume originating from countries worldwide.

Rank	Country	Spam volume(%)
1	India	13.7
2	Russia	9.0
3	Vietnam	7.9
4 (tie)	South Korea	6.0
4 (tie)	Indonesia	6.0
6	China	4.7
7	Brazil	4.5
8	United States	3.2

== Trademark issues ==
Hormel Foods Corporation, the maker of SPAM luncheon meat, does not object to the Internet use of the term "spamming". However, they did ask that the capitalized word "Spam" be reserved to refer to their product and trademark.

== Cost–benefit analyses ==
The European Union's Internal Market Commission estimated in 2001 that "junk email" cost Internet users €10 billion per year worldwide. The California legislature found that spam cost United States organizations alone more than $13 billion in 2007, including lost productivity and the additional equipment, software, and manpower needed to combat the problem. Spam's direct effects include the consumption of computer and network resources, and the cost in human time and attention of dismissing unwanted messages. Large companies who are frequent spam targets utilize numerous techniques to detect and prevent spam.

The cost to providers of search engines is significant: "The secondary consequence of spamming is that search engine indexes are inundated with useless pages, increasing the cost of each processed query". The costs of spam also include the collateral costs of the struggle between spammers and the administrators and users of the media threatened by spamming.

Email spam exemplifies a tragedy of the commons: spammers use resources (both physical and human), without bearing the entire cost of those resources. In fact, spammers commonly do not bear the cost at all. This raises the costs for everyone. In some ways spam is even a potential threat to the entire email system, as operated in the past. Since email is so cheap to send, a tiny number of spammers can saturate the Internet with junk mail. Although only a tiny percentage of their targets are motivated to purchase their products (or fall victim to their scams), the low cost may provide a sufficient conversion rate to keep the spamming alive. Furthermore, even though spam appears not to be economically viable as a way for a reputable company to do business, it suffices for professional spammers to convince a tiny proportion of gullible advertisers that it is viable for those spammers to stay in business. Finally, new spammers go into business every day, and the low costs allow a single spammer to do a lot of harm before finally realizing that the business is not profitable.

Some companies and groups "rank" spammers; spammers who make the news are sometimes referred to by these rankings.

=== General costs ===
In all cases listed above, including both commercial and non-commercial, "spam happens" because of a positive cost–benefit analysis result; if the cost to recipients is excluded as an externality the spammer can avoid paying.

Cost is the combination of:

- Overhead: The costs and overhead of electronic spamming include bandwidth, developing or acquiring an email/wiki/blog spam tool, taking over or acquiring a host or zombie, etc.
- Transaction cost: The incremental cost of contacting each additional recipient once a method of spamming is constructed, multiplied by the number of recipients (see CAPTCHA as a method of increasing transaction costs).
- Risks: Chance and severity of legal or public reactions including damages and punitive damages.
- Damage: Impact on the community or communication channels being spammed (see Newsgroup spam).

Benefit is the total expected profit from spam, which may include any combination of the commercial and non-commercial reasons listed above. It is normally linear, based on the incremental benefit of reaching each additional spam recipient, combined with the conversion rate. The conversion rate for botnet-generated spam has recently been measured to be around one in 12,000,000 for pharmaceutical spam and one in 200,000 for infection sites as used by the Storm botnet. The authors of the study calculating those conversion rates noted, "After 26 days, and almost 350 million e-mail messages, only 28 sales resulted."

== In crime ==
Spam can be used to spread computer viruses, trojan horses, or other malicious software. The objective may be identity theft, or worse (e.g., advance fee fraud). Some spam attempts to capitalize on human greed, while some attempts to take advantage of the victims' inexperience with computer technology to trick them (e.g., phishing).

One of the world's most prolific spammers, Robert Alan Soloway, was arrested by US authorities on May 31, 2007. Described as one of the top ten spammers in the world, Soloway was charged with 35 criminal counts, including mail fraud, wire fraud, e-mail fraud, aggravated identity theft, and money laundering. Prosecutors allege that Soloway used millions of "zombie" computers to distribute spam during 2003. This is the first case in which US prosecutors used identity theft laws to prosecute a spammer for taking over someone else's Internet domain name.

In an attempt to assess potential legal and technical strategies for stopping illegal spam, a study cataloged three months of online spam data and researched website naming and hosting infrastructures. The study concluded that: 1) half of all spam programs have their domains and servers distributed over just eight percent or fewer of the total available hosting registrars and autonomous systems, with 80 percent of spam programs overall being distributed over just 20 percent of all registrars and autonomous systems; 2) of the 76 purchases for which the researchers received transaction information, there were only 13 distinct banks acting as credit card acquirers and only three banks provided the payment servicing for 95 percent of the spam-advertised goods in the study; and, 3) a "financial blacklist" of banking entities that do business with spammers would dramatically reduce monetization of unwanted e-mails. Moreover, this blacklist could be updated far more rapidly than spammers could acquire new banking resources, an asymmetry favoring anti-spam efforts.

== Political issues ==
An ongoing concern expressed by parties such as the Electronic Frontier Foundation and the American Civil Liberties Union has to do with so-called "stealth blocking", a term for ISPs employing aggressive spam blocking without their users' knowledge. These groups' concern is that ISPs or technicians seeking to reduce spam-related costs may select tools that (either through error or design) also block non-spam e-mail from sites seen as "spam-friendly". Few object to the existence of these tools; it is their use in filtering the mail of users who are not informed of their use that draws fire.

Even though it is possible in some jurisdictions to treat some spam as unlawful merely by applying existing laws against trespass and conversion, some laws specifically targeting spam have been proposed. In 2004, United States passed the CAN-SPAM Act of 2003 that provided ISPs with tools to combat spam. This act allowed Yahoo! to successfully sue Eric Head who settled the lawsuit for several thousand U.S. dollars in June 2004. But the law is criticized by many for not being effective enough. Indeed, the law was supported by some spammers and organizations that support spamming, and opposed by many in the anti-spam community.

== Court cases ==
=== United States ===
Earthlink won a $25 million judgment against one of the most notorious and active "spammers" Khan C. Smith in 2001 for his role in founding the modern spam industry which dealt billions in economic damage and established thousands of spammers into the industry. His email efforts were said to make up more than a third of all Internet email being sent from 1999 until 2002.

Sanford Wallace and Cyber Promotions were the target of a string of lawsuits, many of which were settled out of court, up through a 1998 Earthlink settlement that put Cyber Promotions out of business. Attorney Laurence Canter was disbarred by the Tennessee Supreme Court in 1997 for sending prodigious amounts of spam advertising his immigration law practice. In 2005, Jason Smathers, a former America Online employee, pleaded guilty to charges of violating the CAN-SPAM Act. In 2003, he sold a list of approximately 93 million AOL subscriber e-mail addresses to Sean Dunaway who sold the list to spammers.

In 2007, Robert Soloway lost a case in a federal court against the operator of a small Oklahoma-based Internet service provider who accused him of spamming. U.S. Judge Ralph G. Thompson granted a motion by plaintiff Robert Braver for a default judgment and permanent injunction against him. The judgment includes a statutory damages award of about $10 million under Oklahoma law.

In June 2007, two men were convicted of eight counts stemming from sending millions of e-mail spam messages that included hardcore pornographic images. Jeffrey A. Kilbride, 41, of Venice, California was sentenced to six years in prison, and James R. Schaffer, 41, of Paradise Valley, Arizona, was sentenced to 63 months. In addition, the two were fined $100,000, ordered to pay $77,500 in restitution to AOL, and ordered to forfeit more than $1.1 million, the amount of illegal proceeds from their spamming operation. The charges included conspiracy, fraud, money laundering, and transportation of obscene materials. The trial, which began on June 5, was the first to include charges under the CAN-SPAM Act of 2003, according to a release from the Department of Justice. The specific law that prosecutors used under the CAN-Spam Act was designed to crack down on the transmission of pornography in spam.

In 2005, Scott J. Filary and Donald E. Townsend of Tampa, Florida were sued by Florida Attorney General Charlie Crist for violating the Florida Electronic Mail Communications Act. The two spammers were required to pay $50,000 to cover the costs of investigation by the state of Florida, and a $1.1 million penalty if spamming were to continue, the $50,000 was not paid, or the financial statements provided were found to be inaccurate. The spamming operation was successfully shut down.

Edna Fiedler of Olympia, Washington, on June 25, 2008, pleaded guilty in a Tacoma court and was sentenced to two years imprisonment and five years of supervised release or probation in an Internet $1 million "Nigerian check scam." She conspired to commit bank, wire and mail fraud, against US citizens, specifically using Internet by having had an accomplice who shipped counterfeit checks and money orders to her from Lagos, Nigeria, the previous November. Fiedler shipped out $609,000 fake check and money orders when arrested and prepared to send additional $1.1 million counterfeit materials. Also, the U.S. Postal Service recently intercepted counterfeit checks, lottery tickets and eBay overpayment schemes with a value of $2.1 billion.

In a 2009 opinion, Gordon v. Virtumundo, Inc., 575 F.3d 1040, the Ninth Circuit assessed the standing requirements necessary for a private plaintiff to bring a civil cause of action against spam senders under the CAN-SPAM Act of 2003, as well as the scope of the CAN-SPAM Act's federal preemption clause.

=== United Kingdom ===
In the first successful case of its kind, Nigel Roberts from the Channel Islands won £270 against Media Logistics UK who sent junk e-mails to his personal account.

In January 2007, a Sheriff Court in Scotland awarded Mr. Gordon Dick £750 (the then maximum sum that could be awarded in a Small Claim action) plus expenses of £618.66, a total of £1368.66 against Transcom Internet Services Ltd. for breaching anti-spam laws. Transcom had been legally represented at earlier hearings, but were not represented at the proof, so Gordon Dick got his decree by default. It is the largest amount awarded in compensation in the United Kingdom since Roberts v Media Logistics case in 2005.

Despite the statutory tort that is created by the Regulations implementing the EC Directive, few other people have followed their example. As the Courts engage in active case management, such cases would probably now be expected to be settled by mediation and payment of nominal damages.

=== New Zealand ===
In October 2008, an international internet spam operation run from New Zealand was cited by American authorities as one of the world's largest, and for a time responsible for up to a third of all unwanted e-mails. In a statement the US Federal Trade Commission (FTC) named Christchurch's Lance Atkinson as one of the principals of the operation. New Zealand's Internal Affairs announced it had lodged a $200,000 claim in the High Court against Atkinson and his brother Shane Atkinson and courier Roland Smits, after raids in Christchurch. This marked the first prosecution since the Unsolicited Electronic Messages Act (UEMA) was passed in September 2007. The FTC said it had received more than three million complaints about spam messages connected to this operation, and estimated that it may be responsible for sending billions of illegal spam messages. The US District Court froze the defendants' assets to preserve them for consumer redress pending trial. U.S. co-defendant Jody Smith forfeited more than $800,000 and faces up to five years in prison for charges to which he pleaded guilty.

=== Bulgaria ===
Bulgaria permits unsolicited commercial messages (spam) provided that the messages are clearly marked as such, in accordance with the Bulgarian E-Commerce Act (ECA). Spam messages may not be sent to recipients who have opted out. When a user opts out, their email address is added to a public registry. Companies that send spam to addresses listed in this registry are subject to fines. In addition, the ECA prohibits sending spam from invalid addresses or when the sender's identity is concealed.

The legal framework has enabled the possibility of lawsuits against Bulgarian Internet service providers (ISPs) and public email services that implement anti-spam policies, as such policies may be interpreted as obstructing legitimate commercial activity, potentially violating Bulgarian antitrust legislation. Although no lawsuits had been filed as of the last update, several cases involving alleged interference with the delivery of commercial messages were reportedly under review by the Bulgarian Antitrust Commission (Комисия за защита на конкуренцията).

The law also includes controversial provisions, such as the creation of a nationwide public electronic register of email addresses belonging to entities that do not wish to receive unsolicited messages. Critics have raised concerns that the register is susceptible to abuse, particularly as a source for e-mail address harvesting, since submitting false or inaccurate information to the register constitutes a criminal offense under Bulgarian law.

== Newsgroups ==
- news.admin.net-abuse.email

== See also ==
- Address munging – Privacy technique to cloak e-mail addresses (avoidance technique)
- Advance-fee scam – Type of confidence trick fraud (Nigerian spam)
- Anti-spam techniques – Methods to prevent email spam
- Chain letter – Letter written in succession by a group of people
- Cold email – Unsolicited email
- Copypasta – Block of text copied and pasted across the Internet
- Image spam – Type of email spam
- Junk mail – Distribution of advertising by direct mail or letterbox drop
- List of spammers
- Phishing – Form of social engineering
- Social spam – Spam on social networking services
- Spam and Open Relay Blocking System (SORBS) – List of e-mail servers suspected of enabling spam
- SpamCop – Email spam reporting service
- The Spamhaus Project – Organization targeting email spammers
- Spamigation – Mass litigation conducted to intimidate large numbers of people
- VoIP spam
- Spoetry – Poetic verse composed from spam e-mail contents
- Sporgery – Posting a flood of articles to a Usenet group, with falsified headers
- Suppression list – List of opted-out e-mail addresses
- Voice phishing, also known as vishing – Phishing attack via telephony

History

- Howard Carmack
- Make Money Fast – Electronic chain letter
- Sanford Wallace – American internet spammer (born 1968)
- Spam King
- Usenet Death Penalty – Policy of blocking and deleting posts
