= Spam King =

The title Spam King may refer to:

- Eddie Davidson (1972–2008), American spammer, 2002–2007
- Oleg Nikolaenko (born 1987), Russian spammer
- Ryan Pitylak (born 1982), Also known as the "Texas Spam King"
- Alan Ralsky (1945–2021), American fraudster who gained notoriety after a 2002 Slashdot posting
- Scott Richter (born 1967)
- Robert Soloway (born 1980)
- Sanford Wallace (born 1968)

== See also ==
- List of spammers
