= Issues relating to social networking services =

The advent of social networking services has led to many issues spanning from misinformation and disinformation to privacy concerns related to public and private personal data.

== Spamming ==
Spamming on online social networks is quite prevalent. The primary motivation for spamming is to make money, usually from some form of advertising. Detecting such spamming activity has been well studied by developing a semi-automated model to detect spam. For instance, text mining techniques are leveraged to detect regular activity of spamming which reduces the viewership and brings down the reputation (or credibility) of a public pages maintained over Facebook. On some online social networks like Twitter, users have evolved mechanisms to report spammers which has been studied and analyzed.

== Privacy ==
Privacy concerns with social networking services have been raised, with growing concern from users about the privacy of their personal information and the threat of sexual predators. Users of these services also need to be aware of data theft and viruses. However, large services, such as Discord and X, often work with law enforcement to try to prevent such incidents. In addition, there is a perceived privacy threat in relation to placing too much personal information in the hands of large corporations or governmental bodies, allowing a profile to be produced on an individual's behavior on which decisions, detrimental to an individual, may be taken. Furthermore, there is an issue over the control of data and information that was altered or removed by the user may, in fact, be retained and passed to third parties. This danger was highlighted when the controversial social networking site Quechup harvested e-mail addresses from users' e-mail accounts for use in a spamming operation.

In medical and scientific research, asking subjects for information about their behaviors is normally strictly scrutinized by institutional review boards, for example, to ensure that adolescents and their parents have informed consent. It is not clear whether the same rules apply to researchers who collect data from social networking sites. These sites often contain a great deal of data that is hard to obtain via traditional means. Even though the data are public, republishing it in a research paper might be considered invasion of privacy.

Privacy on social networking sites can be undermined by many factors. For example, users may disclose personal information, sites may not take adequate steps to protect user privacy, and third parties frequently use information posted on social networks for a variety of purposes. "For the Net generation, social networking sites have become the preferred forum for social interactions, from posturing and role playing to simply sounding off. However, because such forums are relatively easy to access, posted content can be reviewed by anyone with an interest in the users' personal information". The UK government has plans to monitor traffic on social networks. As well, schemes similar to e-mail jamming have been proposed for networks such as Twitter and Facebook. These would involve "friending" and "following" large numbers of random people to thwart attempts at network analysis. Privacy concerns have been found to differ between users according to gender and personality. Women are less likely to publish information that reveals methods of contacting them. Personality measures openness, extraversion, and conscientiousness were found to positively affect the willingness to disclose data, while neuroticism decreases the willingness to disclose personal information.

Another debate lies in the design of algorithmic systems to target specific audiences on social networking sites. With multiple formats for marketing, Facebook offers a variety of direct marketing options for advertisers to reach their intended audience. For example, these ads may appear as suggested ad posts on the home News Feed or on the right side of the feed as a banner. Businesses may create a page to outline their company and post related information, promotions and contact information to it, directly reaching their interested audience. Users who "like" a business page will be subscribed to receive these business' updates on their home News Feed. Banner ads and suggested posts are paid for by marketers and advertisers to reach their intended audience. Like other methods of marketing, emotional connections are critical to reaching the user. From the fourth quarter of 2012 to the fourth quarter of 2013, Facebook increased its advertising click-through rate by 365%, having 2.5 million promoted suggested posts on user's news feeds. This surge of posts resulted in an influx of information that was difficult to organize. A study of the emotional responses to advertising on Facebook found that Business Pages found the highest appeal to users because they were only recommended when liked by the user or the user's friends. “Liked” pages have higher credibility to users. However, a change in algorithm announced on April 10, 2014, said that Business Pages were receiving a reduced reach after engaging in “click bait” tactics (fooling users to click links to things other than what discretely said on Facebook). The quantity of engagement on Facebook posts are measured, relaying important information about the user audience and their actions online.

The debate questions to what extent the design of these systems is compromising the needs, privacy and information of the users. More research is needed to evaluate if allowing advertising to access user information to specifically tailor content to their choices and interactions, for example by placing ads within their personal feeds and throughout their use of the site, is compromising the user's information and social wellbeing. John Herrman (2018) compares the function of algorithms in adjusting content to omniscience and recounts the unpleasant experiences that coincide as a result. He calls to web browsing on Amazon, where products he browsed through briefly reappear on other news feeds, including his Instagram feed. He outlines the experience as if the networks “[have] got eyes everywhere,” and suggests that this looming omniscience may alter how we interact online, even “risk driving away followers in the process.” This may deter users from engaging in social interactions online and points to how much advertisers are able to tailor information to their intended audience. This debate was further ignited in early 2018. On April 10, 2018, Mark Zuckerberg testified before Congress on questions defining Facebook's policy, information handling and data design systems. Congress placed emphasis on addressing Facebook's tracking of user data online, skeptical that the social networking site can regulate itself.

=== Data mining ===
Through data mining, companies are able to improve their sales and profitability. With this data, companies create customer profiles that contain customer demographics and online behavior. A recent strategy has been the purchase and production of "network analysis software". This software is able to sort out through the influx of social networking data for any specific company. Facebook has been especially important to marketing strategists. Facebook's controversial "Social Ads" program gives companies access to the millions of profiles in order to tailor their ads to a Facebook user's own interests and hobbies. However, rather than sell actual user information, Facebook sells tracked "social actions". That is, they track the websites a user uses outside of Facebook through a program called Facebook Beacon.

== Notifications ==
There has been a trend for social networking sites to send out only "positive" notifications to users. For example, sites such as Bebo, Facebook, and MySpace will not send notifications to users when they are removed from a person's friends list. Likewise, Bebo will send out a notification if a user is moved to the top of another user's friends list but no notification is sent if they are moved down the list. This allows users to purge undesirables from their list extremely easily and often without confrontation since a user will rarely notice if one person disappears from their friends list. It also enforces the general positive atmosphere of the website without drawing attention to unpleasant happenings such as friends falling out, rejection and failed relationships.

== Access to information ==
Many social networking services, such as Facebook, provide the user with a choice of who can view their profile. This is supposed to prevent unauthorized users from accessing their information. Parents who want to access their child's MySpace or Facebook account have become a big problem for teenagers who do not want their profile seen by their parents. By making their profile private, teens can select who may see their page, allowing only people added as "friends" to view their profile and preventing unwanted viewing of the profile by parents. Most teens are constantly trying to create a structural barrier between their private life and their parents. To edit information on a certain social networking service account, the social networking sites require you to log in or provide a password. This is designed to prevent unauthorized users from adding, changing, or removing personal information, pictures, or other data.

== Impact on employability ==
Social networking sites have created issues among getting hired for jobs and losing jobs because of exposing inappropriate content, posting photos of embarrassing situations or posting comments that contain potentially offensive comments (e.g., racist, homophobic or defamatory comments), or even political comments that are contrary to those of the employer. There are works which recommend friends to social networking users based on their political opinions. Many people use social networking sites to express their personal opinions about current events and news issues to their friends. If a potential applicant expresses personal opinions on political issues or makes potentially embarrassing posts online on a publicly available social networking platform, employers can access their employees' and applicants' profiles, and judge them based on their social behavior or political views. According to Silicon Republic's statistics, 17,000 young people in six countries were interviewed in a survey. 1 in 10 people aged 16 to 34 have been rejected for a job because of comments made on an online profile. This shows the effects that social networks have had on people's lives. There have been numerous cases where employees have lost jobs because their opinions represented their companies negatively. In September 2013, a woman got fired over Facebook because she posted disruptive information about her company stating that military patrons should not receive special treatment or discounts. A manager of the company found her opinion online, disagreed with it, and fired her because it went against the company's mission statement. In November 2012, a woman posted a racist remark about the President of the United States and mentioned a possible assassination. She lost her job, and was put under investigation by the Secret Service.

Not only have employees lost their jobs in the United States, but it has happened with social network users internationally. In April 2011, a Lloyd's banking group employee in the United Kingdom was fired for making a sarcastic post about the higher salary of her boss in relation to hers. In February 2013 there was another case where a flight attendant working for a Russian airline lost her job because she posted a photo of herself giving the middle finger to a plane full of passengers. The photo went viral exposing it all over the Internet. In November 2009, a woman working for IBM in Quebec, Canada, lost her company's health insurance benefits because she posted photos displaying her mental health problem. The company decided to cut her benefits because it was costing them additional funds.

Cases like these have created some privacy implications as to whether or not companies should have the right to look at employees' social network profiles. In March 2012, Facebook decided they might take legal action against employers for gaining access to employee's profiles through their passwords. According to Facebook Chief Privacy Officer for policy, Erin Egan, the company has worked hard to give its users the tools to control who sees their information. He also said users shouldn't be forced to share private information and communications just to get a job. According to the network's Statement of Rights and Responsibilities, sharing or soliciting a password is a violation to Facebook. Employees may still give their password information out to get a job, but according to Erin Egan, Facebook will continue to do their part to protect the privacy and security of their users.

== Potential for misuse ==
The relative freedom afforded by social networking services has caused concern regarding the potential of its misuse by individual patrons. In October 2006, a fake MySpace profile created in the name of Josh Evans by Lori Janine Drew led to the suicide of Megan Meier. The event incited global concern regarding the use of social networking services for bullying purposes. In July 2008, a Briton and a former friend was ordered to pay a total of GBP £22,000 (about US$44,000) for libel and breach of privacy. He had posted a fake page on Facebook purporting to be that of a former school friend Matthew Firsht, with whom he had fallen out in 2000. The page falsely claimed that Firsht was homosexual and that he was dishonest.

At the same time, genuine use of social networking services has been treated with suspicion on the ground of the services' misuse. In September 2008, the profile of Australian Facebook user Elmo Keep was banned by the site's administrators on the grounds that it violated the site's terms of use. Keep is one of several users of Facebook who were banned from the site on the presumption that their names aren't real, as they bear resemblance to the names of characters like Sesame Street's Elmo.

Online social networks have also become a platform for spread of rumors, one such study has analyzed rumors in retrospect. One of the approaches to detect rumors (or misinformation) is to compare the spread of topic over social network (say Twitter) with those spread by reliable and authorized news agencies.

== Unauthorized access ==
There are different forms where user data in social networks are accessed and updated without a user's permission. One study highlighted that the most common incidents included inappropriate comments posted on social networking sites (43%), messages sent to contacts that were never authored (25%) and change of personal details (24%). The most incidents are carried out by the victim's friends (36%) or partners (21%) and one in ten victims say their ex-partner has logged into their account without prior consent. The survey found that online social network accounts had been subject to unauthorized access in 60 million cases in 2011.

== Risk for child safety ==
Citizens and governments have been concerned with the misuse of social networking services by children and teenagers, in particular in relation to online sexual predators. For instance, there is a study which suggests the children are not too far from inappropriate content on YouTube. Overuse of social networking may also make children more susceptible to depression and anxiety. Governments are taking action to better understand the problem and find some solutions. A 2008 panel concluded that technological fixes such as age verification and scans are relatively ineffective means of apprehending online predators. In May 2010, a child pornography social networking site with hundreds of members was dismantled by law enforcement. It was deemed "the largest crimes against children case brought anywhere by anyone". Girls in particular are also known to be at more of risk online using social networks than boys. According to the article, High Tech or High Risks: Moral Panics About Girls Online, it suggests that young girls are more at risks because they are often represented through "products of play" in transgressive poses because they often manipulate other users online by making themselves look older than what they actually appear which can attract sexual predators. Many parents of teenage girls worry about their safety online because of the many manipulations there are online and on social networking sites.

Social networking can also be a risk to child safety in another way; parents can get addicted to games and neglect their children. One instance in South Korea resulted in the death of a child from starvation. Law enforcement agencies have published articles with their recommendations to parents about their children's use of social networking sites.

== Trolling ==
Social networking sites such as Facebook are occasionally used to emotionally abuse, harass or bully individuals, either by posting defamatory statements or by forwarding private digital photos or videos that can have an adverse impact on the individuals depicted in the videos. Such actions are often referred to as "trolling". Confrontations in the real world can also be transferred to the online world. Trolling can occur in many different forms, such as (but not limited to) defacement of deceased person(s) tribute pages, name-calling, playing online pranks on individuals and making controversial or inflammatory comments with the intention to cause anger and cause arguments. Individuals troll for many reasons. The psychology behind why people troll according to Psychology Today is due to anonymity, perceived obscurity, and a perceived lack of consequences for online misbehavior. Trolls may also do their activities due to a perceived majority status, social identity salience and due to a sense by the troll that she or he is surrounded by online 'friends'. Trolls may also engage in harmful acts due to desensitization or negative personality traits (Fox, 2014). As these eight reasons behind the thought processes of trolls suggest individuals thrive behind being able to create a false identity or pseudonym to hide behind and the premise that they have 'friends' on social networks that agree with their outlook on certain topics, thus join in on trolling. The reason for the perceived lack of consequences is that they believe they have created an identity in which they can not be seen as a real life human and more of a persona/avatar that they have created, which leads them to feel that they will not face the consequences of being an online troll.

Trolling is a prominent issue in the 2010s, and as the Internet and social media is consistently expanding and more individuals sign up to social networking sites, more people come under fire and become the target of trolls. As more people sign up to social networking sites, more celebrities are also becoming more prominent on these sites. With a variety of celebrities joining social networking sites, trolls tend to target abuse towards them. With some famous people gaining an influx of negative comments and slew of abuse from trolls it causes them to 'quit' social media. One prime example of a celebrity quitting social media is Stephen Fry. He left Twitter due to "too much aggression and unkindness around" emphasizing how trolls can negatively impact people's lives (Cohen, 2014). As celebrities face trolls and backlash on social media forcing them to quit, it can mean that they become less in touch with their fans, potentially losing a fan base, as they are not as relevant as people enjoy interacting with celebrities and makes them feel as though they are valued. As trolling can lead to celebrities deleting their social networks such as Twitter, it emphasizes how trolls can win, and can ruin people's lives.

While trolls believe that they do not face consequences and can troll others on the Internet without repercussions, in the 2000s, due to high-profile cases where cyberbullies have allegedly been factors in suicides attributed to bullying, more laws have been put in place by governments. Trolls can face going to prison for certain actions that they take on the Internet, such as spreading hate speech such as racist messages. One of the highest profile cases is racist trolling. Racist trolling has seen individuals been sent to prison for Tweets they have sent that to them may have seemed harmless and not racist. One case of this in recent years is Liam Stacey who was jailed for fifty-six days for tweeting offensive messages such as 'Muamba is dead, hahahaha', referring to when footballer Fabrice Muamba collapsed during a professional football game for Bolton Wanders (Williams, 2012). This highlights how offensive tweets and messages sent on any social networking platform does have repercussions for individuals and they have to be aware that they have to face the consequences of their actions.

== Radicalization ==
Social networking sites allow a greater spread of ideas than previously possible. However, this has the side effect of allowing those with fringe political and/or economic views, such as white nationalists, terrorists, racists and neo-Nazis, to easily spread propaganda and convert others to their ideology. This is due to the fact social networking sites often have algorithms for finding content, and these algorithms can trap users in an ‘echo chamber’ or ‘rabbit hole’ that allows for easier radicalization. Due to this risk, many social networking sites put measures in place to prevent hate speech and radicalization, though these have been controversial due to the argument that they, intentionally or not, limit free speech on the Internet.

== Online bullying ==
Online bullying, also called cyberbullying, is a relatively common occurrence and it can often result in emotional trauma for the victim. Depending on the networking outlet, up to 39% of users admit to being "cyber-bullied". In her article, "Why Youth (Heart) Social Network Sites", danah boyd, published in December 2007, a researcher of social networks, quotes a teenager. The teenager expresses frustration towards networking sites like MySpace because it causes drama and too much emotional stress. There are not many limitations as to what individuals can post when online. Individuals are given the power to post offensive remarks or pictures that could potentially cause a great amount of emotional pain for another individual.

== Interpersonal communication ==
Interpersonal communication has been a growing issue as more and more people have turned to social networking as a means of communication. "Benniger (1987) describes how mass media has gradually replaced interpersonal communication as a socializing force. Further, social networking sites have become popular sites for youth culture to explore themselves, relationships, and share cultural artifacts".

The convenience that social network sites give users to communicate with one another can also damage their interpersonal communication. Sherry Turkle, the founder and director of the MIT Initiative on Technology and Self, stated, "Networked, we are together, but so lessened are our expectations of each other that we feel utterly alone. And there is the risk that we come to see others as objects to be accessed--and only for the parts we find useful, comforting, or amusing". Furthermore, social network sites can create insincere friendships, Turkle also noted, "They nurture friendships on social-networking sites and then wonder if they are among friends. They become confused about companionship".

== Psychological effects of social networking ==
As social networking sites have risen in popularity over the past years, people have been spending an excessive amount of time on the Internet in general and social networking sites in specific. This has led researchers to debate the establishment of Internet addiction as an actual clinical disorder. Social networking can also affect the extent to which a person feels lonely. In a Newsweek article, Johannah Cornblatt explains "Social-networking sites like Facebook and MySpace may provide people with a false sense of connection that ultimately increases loneliness in people who feel alone." John T. Cacioppo, a neuroscientist at the University of Chicago, claims that social networking can foster feelings of sensitivity to disconnection, which can lead to loneliness. Fabio Sabatini and Francesco Sarracino found that if an individual tends to (a) trust people and (b) have a significant number of face-to-face interactions, the individual is likely to assess their own well-being as relatively high. The researchers found that online social networking plays a positive role in subjective well-being when the networking is used to facilitate physical interactions, but networking activities that do not facilitate face-to-face interactions tend to erode trust, and this erosion can then negatively affect subjective well-being (independent of the online social interaction itself). Sabatini and Sarracino conclude that "The overall effect of networking on individual welfare is significantly negative."

However, some scholars have expressed that concerns about social networking are often exaggerated and poorly researched. Social Media can be argued to have a positive influence on society by giving those who are highly introverted or socially inept a low risk means of communication that removes interpersonal cues that could cause anxiety or panic attacks. It has also been argued among academics that correct moderation by an authority figure such as a boss or parent can improve the perceived well-being of an individual who navigates social media. As well as a variety of longitudinal studies that look at children at the start of the social media digital era up to the present, finding no correlation between social media screen time and mental health.

== Patents ==
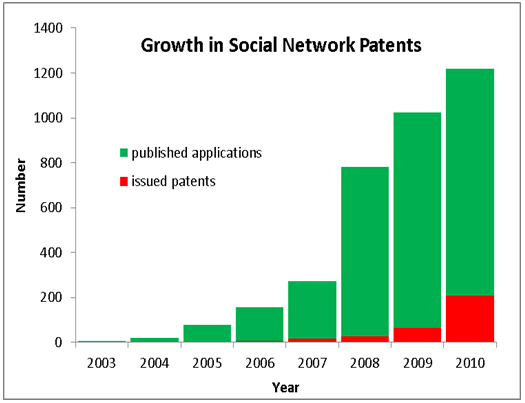
Number of US social network patent applications published per year and patents issued per year

There has been rapid growth in the number of U.S. patent applications that cover new technologies related to social networking. The number of published applications has been growing rapidly since 2003. There were over 3,500 published applications by 2011 [95]. As many as 7,000 applications may be currently on file including those that haven't been published yet. Only about 400 of these applications have issued as patents, however, due largely to the multi-year backlog in examination of business method patents and the difficulty in getting these patent applications allowed.

It has been reported that social networking patents are important for the establishment of new start-up companies. It has also been reported, however, that social networking patents inhibit innovation. On June 15, 2010, the United States Patent and Trademark Office awarded Amazon.com a patent for a "Social Networking System" based on its ownership of PlanetAll. The patent describes a Social Networking System as:

A networked computer system provides various services for assisting users in locating, and establishing contact relationships with, other users. For example, in one embodiment, users can identify other users based on their affiliations with particular schools or other organizations. The system also provides a mechanism for a user to selectively establish contact relationships or connections with other users, and to grant permissions for such other users to view personal information of the user. The system may also include features for enabling users to identify contacts of their respective contacts. In addition, the system may automatically notify users of personal information updates made by their respective contacts.

The patent has garnered attention due to its similarity to the popular social networking site Facebook.

== Workers' rights ==
What types of speech workers are protected from being fired for on social networking websites has been an issue for American companies with over 100 complaints as of 2011 on this topic having been made to the National Labor Relations Board (NLRB). The National Labor Relations Act protects workers from being fired for protected concerted activity, which prevents workers from being fired for collective action, while allowing companies the right to fire workers for individual actions they take against the company. Companies are concerned with the potential damage comments online can do to public image due to their visibility and accessibility, but despite over 100 cases being presented thus far to NLRB only one has led to a formal ruling, leaving uncertainty as to the boundaries of what types of speech the NLRB will ultimately protect or condemn.

== Centralized architecture ==
Most of the existing SNS sites use one or multiple dedicated data centers to serve all its users. Such infrastructure-based systems faces over-provisioning during non-peak hours, while may encounter service outage during peak hours, due to the highly dynamic of SNS users' activities. There are several proposals, leveraging a decentralized architecture to ensure the scalability of SNS sites with low infrastructure cost. These proposals include Fethr, uaOSN, and Cuckoo.

== Virtual identity suicide ==
There is a growing number of social network users who decide to quit their user account by committing a so-called virtual identity suicide or Web 2.0 suicide. A 2013 study in the journal Cyberpsychology, Behavior, and Social Networking investigated this phenomenon from the perspective of Facebook users. The number one reason for these users was privacy concerns (48%), being followed by a general dissatisfaction with the social networking website (14%), negative aspects regarding social network friends (13%) and the feeling of getting addicted to the social networking website (6%). Facebook quitters were found to be more concerned about privacy, more addicted to the Internet and more conscientious.

== Social overload ==
The increasing number of messages and social relationships embedded in SNS also increases the amount of social information demanding a reaction from SNS users. Consequently, SNS users perceive they are giving too much social support to other SNS friends. This dark side of SNS usage is called 'social overload'. It is caused by the extent of usage, number of friends, subjective social support norms, and type of relationship (online-only vs offline friends) while age has only an indirect effect. The psychological and behavioral consequences of social overload include perceptions of SNS exhaustion, low user satisfaction, and high intentions to reduce or stop using SNS.

== Social anxiety ==
Smartphones and social networking services enable us to stay connected continuously with people around us or far away from us, which however is sometimes the root of our anxiety in social life. The eagerness to know what everyone was saying and the tendency to see if anyone shared new things are typical "symptoms" of this anxiety called FoMO. There is a study that examined possible connections between FOMO and social media engagement indicating that FoMO was associated with lower need satisfaction, mood and life satisfaction.

Another type of social anxiety is the FoBM (fear of being missed). It comes from the situation that we can't produce share-content for people to consume. The FoBM is a counterpart of FoMO; however, compared to FoMO it may have a more serious impact since the exclusion from the conversation can result in continuous exclusion later.

== Effects on personal relationships and social capital ==
The number of contacts on a social platform is sometimes considered an indicator of social capital. However, studies show it is rather an indicator of low self-esteem and of a form of social compensation. Indeed, people tend to add friends to compensate low self-esteem and there is a high correlation between the number of "friends" on social media platforms and feeling social anxiety, leading to symptoms of major depression and dysthymia. If we consider this aspect with regards to the relationships maintained through social media platforms, we can easily point out a change in our understanding of friendship. As a matter of fact, online platforms and social media services altered the old definition of friendship. Indeed, friendship "redoubleth joys, and cutteth griefs in halves" as stated by Francis Bacon. However, nowadays we see that Facebook friends, for instance, encourage negative feelings, such as envy, revenge and sadness.

When it comes to friendship, we can wonder whether friendship on online platforms is a real form of friendship, or it is just a sort of metaphor to compensate for social communication problems. Actually, a lot of changes can be spotted in its old definition compared to the one in the era of social media. Friendship used to relate to the public sphere as explained in Nicomachean Ethics, however nowadays friendship is rather exposed publicly on different social media platforms.

Croom et al. found that Facebook users know only a bit more than two thirds of their "friends" on the platform, meaning that they did not know one-third of the individuals in their friend-lists. This raises security and privacy issues and the project researchers alerted participants that they would better unfriend people they did not recognize.

== Advertisements ==
On social networking services like Facebook and YouTube, there is a high level of scam advertisements. This can cause financial damages for users who have been reassured by the ad policies of such social networks to prohibit scams and other malicious content.

While advertisements are a needed stream of revenue for the social networks, they have also been criticized for their explicit content.
