= Kevin Fox =

Kevin Fox may refer to:

- Kevin Fox (footballer) (1917–1993), Australian rules football player
- Kevin Fox (designer), user interface designer
