= List of spammers =

This is a list of individuals and organizations noteworthy for engaging in bulk electronic spamming, either on their own behalf or on behalf of others. It is not a list of all spammers— only those whose actions have attracted substantial independent attention.

- Nathan Blecharczyk, one of the founders of Airbnb, who paid his way through Harvard by providing spammers hosting services.
- Shane Atkinson, who was named in an interview by The New Zealand Herald as the man behind an operation sending out 100 million emails per day in 2003, who claimed (and appeared) to honor unsubscribe requests, and who claimed to be giving up spamming shortly after the interview. His brother Lance was ordered to pay $2 million to U.S. authorities.
- Serdar Argic (a.k.a. Zumabot), who disrupted Usenet by posting up to 100 messages per day on different newsgroups in an attempt to deny the Armenian genocide.
- Canter & Siegel, a husband and wife who famously posted one of the first commercial Usenet spam advertisements to thousands of newsgroups and were defiant in the face of thousands of email flames, having supposedly generated over $100,000 in revenue from the ad.
- Richard Colbert, a retired spammer (as of 2003) who scoured AOL for business contacts, offering spam as his service, claims to have honored "unsubscribe" requests, and gave an interview to The New York Times.
- David D'Amato, a former assistant high school principal who was fined $5,000 and spent a year in prison after being convicted in 2001 for online crimes including email bombs targeted at individuals and institutions.
- Eddie Davidson, a convicted spammer who died along with his wife and daughter in 2008 in a murder-suicide.
- Peter Francis-Macrae, convicted of fraudulent trading, blackmail, and violent threats after sending thousands of businesses solicitations to purchase .eu internet domains he did not own.
- Davis Wolfgang Hawke, who lost a $12.8 million judgment against AOL in 2004 after using spam to promote a neo-Nazi agenda.
- Jumpstart Technologies, an incubator of prominent social network Hi5 and the first entity to pay a settlement as great as $900,000 for violating the CAN-SPAM act, later spun off into social networking site Tagged, which subsequently paid upwards of $1.5 million in various fines and legal settlements involving government entities as well as private individuals, and was referred to by Time magazine as "the world's most annoying website."
- Vardan Kushnir, a famous Russian spammer who was murdered in 2005 for reasons possibly unrelated to his spamming activities
- Peter Levashov, alleged Russian operator of the Kelihos botnet. Extradited by Spain and facing trial, currently in a Connecticut jail.
- Kevin Lipsitz, aka “Krazy Kevin”, a prolific spammer convicted in New York on fraud charges in 1997, stemming from his spamming of Usenet newsgroups with advertisements using AOL.com as a "Reply-to:" address. He resumed spamming in 1999.
- Oleg Nikolaenko, arrested by the Federal Bureau of Investigation in November 2010 as the "King of Spam."
- Ryan Pitylak, known as the “Texas Spam King”, admitted to sending 25 million emails every day at the height of his spamming operation in 2004.
- Alan Ralsky, Scott Bradley, John Bown, William Neil, and James Fite, who pleaded guilty to conspiring to use spam emails to pump and dump thinly traded stocks, in violation of the CAN-SPAM Act. The group faced years of prison time and millions of dollars in penalties under the terms of their plea agreements.
- Dave Rhodes, the (possibly apocryphal) name attached to a famous chain letter titled "MAKE MONEY FAST" that originated in the late 1980s.
- Scott Richter, who paid $7 million to Microsoft in 2006 in a settlement arising out of a lawsuit alleging illegal spam activities.
- Russian Business Network
- Christopher William Smith, who was forced to pay $5.5 million to America Online for spam activity in 2003 and spent 11 years in prison for charges not related to spam.
- Jody Michael Smith, a spammer and director of the world's largest online replica watch network. Shut down by the FBI and FTC in October 2008. Smith served 11 months in federal prison and forfeited over $800,000 in assets.
- Robert Alan Soloway, who lost a $7 million civil judgment against Microsoft and was forced to pay $10 million to a small ISP in Oklahoma. Soloway was eventually caught by the FBI and sentenced to 47 months in prison.
- Gary Thuerk, the "Father of Spam" who sent out the first unsolicited email blast to 600 ARPANet members, in 1978.
- Khan C. Smith, the first major prolific spammer and technology developer to be sued by a major ISP in a landmark case resulting in a $25 million fine and collapse of the largest spam network in history. Court documents show his illegal network delivered over 25% of all email sent in the world until 2001.
- Sanford Wallace, who was fined $4 million under the CAN-SPAM Act in 2006, lost a $230 million judgment to MySpace in May 2008, and was ordered to pay $711 million in damages to Facebook in 2009 for accessing users' accounts without their permission and sending phony posts and messages.
- Adam Guerbuez, who was fined $873 million by the U.S. District Court for Northern District of California in a case brought by Facebook.

== See also ==
- Anti-spam techniques
- List of computer criminals
- Newsgroup spam
