= History of Gmail =

The current Gmail logo.

The public history of Gmail dates back to 2004. Gmail, a free, advertising-supported webmail service with support for Email clients, is a product from Google used by more than 3 billion active users globally. Over its history, the Gmail interface has become integrated with many other products and services from the company, with basic integration as part of Google Account and specific integration points with services such as Google+, Google Calendar, Google Drive, Google Hangouts, Google Meet, YouTube, and Google Buzz. It has also been made available as part of Google Workspace (formerly G Suite). The Official Gmail Blog tracks the public history of Gmail from July 2007.

In 2026, Google integrated the AI model Gemini 3 into Gmail to turn it into personal assistant that composes messages via the (Help me write) feature.

== Internal development ==
Gmail was a project started by Google developer Paul Buchheit, who had already explored the idea of web-based email in the 1990s, before the launch of Hotmail, while working on a personal email software project as a college student. Buchheit began his work on Gmail in August 2001. At Google, Buchheit had first worked on Google Groups and when asked "to build some type of email or personalization product", he created the first version of Gmail in one day, reusing the code from Google Groups. The project was known by the code name Caribou, a reference to a Dilbert comic strip about Project Caribou.

At the time when Gmail was being developed, existing email services such as Yahoo! Mail and Hotmail had extremely slow interfaces written in plain HTML, with almost every action by the user requiring the server to reload the entire webpage. Buchheit attempted to work around the limitations of HTML by using highly interactive JavaScript code, an approach that ultimately came to be called AJAX (Asynchronous JavaScript and XML).

Buchheit recalls that the high volume of internal email at Google created "a very big need for search". Advanced search capabilities eventually led to considerations for providing a generous amount of storage space, which in turn opened up the possibility of allowing users to keep their emails forever, rather than having to delete them to stay under a storage limit. After considering alternatives such as 100 MB, the company finally settled upon 1 GB of space, compared to the 2 to 4 MB that was the standard at the time.

Buchheit had been working on Gmail for about a month when he was joined by another engineer, Sanjeev Singh, with whom he would eventually found the social-networking startup FriendFeed after leaving Google in 2006. Gmail's first product manager, Brian Rakowski, learned about the project on his first day at Google in 2002, fresh out of college. In August 2003, another new Google recruit, Kevin Fox was assigned the task of designing Gmail's interface. When the service was finally launched in April 2004, about a dozen people were working on the project.

Initially the software was available only internally as an email system for Google employees. According to Google, the software had been used internally for "a number of years" before it was released to the public in 2004.

Since Gmail's beta phase, it's gained new features and changes. Google Workspace enhancements are an expansion of its services as well, and in 2024, they added and improved features in Google Gmail. Gmail had to deal with a few service issues throughout the year, too. Around 8 August, Google Gmail and Google Drive were affected by a global outage that disrupted some Gmail users from sending or saving email attachments and lasted for around four hours..

== Public release ==
For much of its development, Gmail had been a skunkworks project, kept secret even from most people within Google. “It wasn’t even guaranteed to launch–we said that it has to reach a bar before it’s something we want to get out there,” says the Gmail interface designer Kevin Fox. By early 2004, however, almost everybody at Google was using Gmail to access the company's internal email system.

Gmail was announced to the public by Google on 1 April 2004, after extensive rumors of its existence during testing. Owing to the April Fool's Day release, the company's press release aroused skepticism in the technology world, especially since Google had been known for making April Fool's jokes, such as PigeonRank. However, they explained that their real joke had been a press release saying that they would take offshoring to the extreme by putting employees in a "Google Copernicus Center" on the Moon. Jonathan Rosenberg, Google's vice-president of products, was quoted by BBC News as saying, "We are very serious about Gmail."

Even when the service was announced to the public, Google did not have the required infrastructure in place to provide millions of users a reliable service with a gigabyte of space apiece. Gmail ran on three hundred old Pentium III computers nobody else at Google wanted. This was sufficient for the limited beta rollout the company planned, which involved inviting about 1,000 opinion leaders and then allowing them to invite their friends and family members to become beta testers, with trials beginning on 21 March 2004.

== Extended beta phase ==
Once it became clear that Gmail was real, and not an April Fools' joke, invitations became actively requested. Although the limited rollout was born of necessity, it created a sense of limited availability which contributed to its publicity attention. “Everyone wanted it even more. It was hailed as one of the best marketing decisions in tech history, but it was a little bit unintentional” says Georges Harik, who was responsible for most of Google's new products at the time.

Active users from the Blogger community were offered the chance to participate in the beta-testing on 20 April and later, Gmail members occasionally received "invitations" which they could send to anyone. One round of invitations was sent out on 1 May and another three invitations were given to all active members on 1 June. When Gmail increased the supply of invitations, the nascent buying and selling market for Gmail invitations collapsed.

During the early months of the initial beta phase, Gmail's well-publicized feature set and the exclusive nature of the accounts caused the aftermarket price of Gmail invitations to skyrocket. According to PC World magazine, Gmail invitations were selling on eBay for as much as US$150, with some accounts being sold for several thousand dollars. After a new round of invitations in early June, the price for invitations fell to between US$2–$5. Websites such as Gmail Swap emerged to allow philanthropic Gmail users to donate invitations to people who wanted them. On 28 June 2004, Google amended its policy to forbid the selling of registered accounts.

In January 2005, security experts discovered a critical flaw in the handling of Gmail messages that would allow hackers to easily access private emails from any Gmail user's account. This was posted with detailed information to popular technology site Slashdot at 9:23 a.m. PST on 12 January 2005. On 13 January 2005, developers at Gmail announced that they had fixed the problem and that the security flaw had been patched. Despite Gmail's status as a beta application, concerns were raised among some users who were using Gmail as their primary mail account. On 1 April 2005, exactly one year after the initial release, Gmail increased the mailbox size to 2 GB, advertising it as "2 GB plus" and introduced some other new features, including formatted editing which gave users the option of sending messages in HTML or plain text.

On 7 June 2005, The Gmail Invitation Spooler was deactivated by the site owner, following a direct request from the Gmail product manager to shut it down. The service was featured in Popular Science magazine and had given out over 1.2 million Gmail accounts.

On 22 June 2005, Gmail's canonical URI changed from http://gmail.google.com/gmail/ to http://mail.google.com/mail/. As of February 2026, those who typed in the former URL were redirected to the latter.

On 2 November 2006, Google began offering a mobile-application based version of Gmail for mobile phones capable of running Java applications. In addition, Sprint announced separately that it would make the application available from its Vision and Power Vision homepages, preloaded onto some new Sprint phones. The application gives Gmail its own custom menu system and the site displays attachments, such as photos and documents in the application. The application was solely developed in Google's Kitchener office.

On 28 January 2007, Google Docs & Spreadsheets was integrated with Gmail, providing the capability to open attached Microsoft Word DOC files directly from Gmail.

On 14 February 2007, invitations were no longer required to create an account and the service was opened for anyone to sign up for.

On 24 October 2007, Google announced that IMAP was available for all accounts, including Google Apps for your Domain.

On 5 June 2008, Google introduced Gmail Labs.

On 8 December 2008, Google added a to-do list to Gmail. When the new Tasks feature is enabled, a box shows up on top of the Gmail window. In it, users can add, reorder and delete tasks. It is also possible to assign a due date to each action and even convert emails into tasks.

On 12 December 2008, Gmail added support for PDF viewing within the browser.

On 24 February 2009, Gmail suffered a two and a half hour outage, affecting 100 million accounts.

On 7 July 2009, Gmail officially exited its beta status in a move to attract more business use of the service.

On 1 September 2009, Gmail suffered another outage for several hours.

In January 2027, Gmail will officially discontinue third-party "Send as" address support.

== Trademark disputes ==
=== Germany ===
The former Google Mail logo, in 2005

The Google Mail logo, in 2010

On 4 July 2005, Google announced that Gmail Deutschland would be rebranded as Google Mail. The domain gmail.com became unavailable in Germany due to trademark disputes, in which case users must use the domain googlemail.com. From that point forward, visitors originating from an IP address determined to be in Germany would be forwarded to googlemail.com where they could obtain an email address containing the new domain.

The domains are interchangeable so users obliged to use the googlemail.com domain are unable to select addresses already chosen by gmail.com users. Inbound emails sent to either googlemail.com or gmail.com addresses will reach the user.

The German naming issue is due to a trademark dispute between Google and Daniel Giersch, who owns a German company called "G-mail" which provides the service of printing out email from senders and sending the print-out via postal mail to the intended recipients. On 30 January 2007, the EU's Office for Harmonization in the Internal Market ruled in favor of Giersch.

Google spoofed "offering" the same service in the Gmail Paper April Fool's Day joke in 2007.

On 13 April 2012, Google received the right to the Gmail trademark in Germany. On that day the gmail.de domain and the Gmail trademark were transferred to Google.

=== Poland ===
In February 2007 Google filed legal action against the owners of gmail.pl, a poet group known in full as Grupa Młodych Artystów i Literatów abbreviated GMAiL (literally, "Group of Young Artists and Writers"). This lawsuit was lost, but the Web site no longer exists.

=== Russian Federation ===
A Russian paid mail redirect service called gmail.ru owns the "Gmail" trademark in the Russian Federation.

The gmail.ru domain name dates from 27 January 2003. The gmail.ru domain name was auctioned.

=== United Kingdom ===
On 19 October 2005, Google voluntarily converted the United Kingdom version of Gmail to Google Mail because of a dispute with the UK company Independent International Investment Research.

Users who registered before the switch to Google Mail were able to keep their Gmail address, although the Gmail logo was replaced with a Google Mail logo. Users who signed up after the name change receive a googlemail.com address, although a reverse of either in the sent email would still deliver it to the same place.

In September 2009, Google began to change the branding of UK accounts back to Gmail, following the resolution of the trademark dispute.

On 3 May 2010, Google announced that they would start to phase out the googlemail.com domain in the UK. Existing users got the option to switch to gmail.com, while new users are now given a gmail.com address by default. Android phone users with googlemail.com domains had to perform a factory reset to restore phone functionality.

== See also ==
- Gmail
- Gmail Drive
- Gmail interface
- History of email
- History of email spam
- History of email marketing
