= Richard Colbert =

American engineer

Richard Colbert is an American former prolific spammer based in Miami, Florida, in an area known as "Spam Beach".

He would obtain clients' email addresses by searching AOL member profiles for phrases such as "business opportunity" or "multilevel marketing", believing them to be small-time salesmen like himself. He would then spam these people with offers for his service to spam on their behalf and reply personally to anyone who responded. Having secured clients, he would send their advertisements to general recipients on lists he had purchased, charging up to $900 for a million addresses.

In a 2003 interview with The New York Times, he insisted he always included legitimate "from" addresses in his messages and honored unsubscribe requests, believing the alternative to be detrimental to the business of online marketing. However, he also used American Express's anonymous $25 temporary credit cards to set up short-lived email accounts with his local operator, BellSouth, from which he could spam freely and without risk of being traced until each address was shut down.

Despite making a profit from spamming (apparently clearing $130,000 in three months), he continued to live in a mobile home and buy his clothes and equipment from eBay.

He retired from spamming in 2003 and was subsequently removed from ROKSO, the Spamhaus Project's list of prolific spammers.

== See also ==
- List of spammers
