= Shane Atkinson (spammer) =

Spammer

Shane Atkinson, of Christchurch, New Zealand was a major spammer whose details were leaked onto the Internet soon after an article was written about him in the New Zealand Herald. After he was exposed as a spammer in 2003, Shane Atkinson found himself at the receiving end of a barrage of public outrage and proclaimed that he would give up spamming.

Atkinson was tracked down by anti-spam collaborators on the Usenet news.net-admin newsgroups. Before being identified, Atkinson's operation would send up to 100 million messages on a "good day," advertising for penis-enlargement pills. The actual spamming was done by a 15-year-old boy in the United States, who earned US$500 a day doing so. His web sites were hosted on Polish and Pakistani network providers.

His brother Lance has also become well-known and was ordered to pay US$2 million to the United States authorities for his spamming operations in March 2005.

An investigation by the BBC broadcast in December 2007 and January 2008 found Atkinson was still active in spamming. Atkinson's Internet service provider was contacted and explained that he was not sending it from his own account but hiding behind a number of other slave or zombie computers, making identification difficult. Simon Cox of the BBC phoned Atkinson in late 2007 and after confirming his identity told him that there were serious allegations about him. He denied them. His reply was

"Well, it wasn’t me, mate. We have closed all that down years ago."

Cox put it to him that he was still controlling a network of computers and that he had been sending out spam.

Atkinson replied

"Well I am not controlling any computers, mate. I’m not interested in talking to you, bye."

Following on Cox's investigation, New Zealand police at the end of 2007 raided four properties in Christchurch and seized 22 computers. They interviewed two men about illegal spamming and in October 2008 the Department of Internal Affairs asked the High Court to impose penalties of NZ$200,000 each for breaching the Unsolicited Electronic Messages Act

On Monday, 22 December 2008 Lance Atkinson was fined NZ$100,000 after the Department of Internal Affairs laid charges under the Unsolicited Electronic Messages Act. It is understood Atkinson settled out of court. In summing up the judge conceded that the offending started before the act came into force and Atkinson had co-operated with the authorities. Lance was the first person to be fined under the act. Shane Atkinson and Roland Smits initially elected to defend the changes before agreeing to pay the NZ$ 100,000 fine in 2009.

== See also ==
- List of spammers
