= Spam in blogs =

Form of spamdexing

Spam in blogs (also known as blog spam, comment spam, or social spam) is a form of spamdexing which utilizes internet sites that allow content to be publicly posted, in order to artificially inflate their website ranking by linking back (also referred to as backlinking) to their web pages. Backlinking helps search algorithms determine the popularity of a web page, which plays a major role for search engines like Google and Microsoft Bing to decide a web page ranking on a certain search query. This helps the spammer's website to list ahead of other sites for certain searches, which helps them to increase the number of visitors to their website.

It may be done by posting random comments on other blog websites (usually by an automated process), or by copying other websites' content and using it on free-to-use publishing services like Blogger and WordPress or publicly accessible wikis, digital guest books, and internet forums.

Note that blog spam also has another meaning, specifically when a blog author creates posts without adding any informational or educational value solely for publishing them on other websites

== History ==
This type of spam originally appeared in internet guestbooks, where spammers repeatedly filled a guestbook with links to their sites and irrelevant comments, to increase their search engine rankings. If an actual comment is given, it is often just "cool page", "nice website", or keywords of the spammed link.

In 2003, spammers began to take advantage of the open nature of comments in the blogging software like Movable Type by repeatedly placing comments on various blog posts that provided nothing more than a link to the spammer's commercial web site. Jay Allen created a free plugin, called MT-BlackList, for the Movable Type weblog tool (versions prior to 3.2) that attempted to alleviate this problem. Many blogging packages now have methods of preventing or reducing the effect of blog spam built in due to its prevalence, although spammers too have developed tools to circumvent them. Many spammers use special blog spamming tools like trackback submitter to bypass comment spam protection on popular blogging systems like Movable Type, WordPress, and others.

== Application-specific implementations ==
Particularly popular software products such as Movable Type and MediaWiki have developed or included anti-spam measures, as spammers focus more on targeting those platforms due to their prevalence on the Internet. Whitelists and blacklists that prevent certain IPs from posting, or that prevent people from posting content that matches certain filters, are common defences although most software tends to use a combination of the variety of different techniques documented below.

The goal in every potential solution is to allow legitimate users to continue posting their comments (and often even add links to their comments, as that is considered by some to be a valuable aspect of any comments section, when the links are relevant or related to the article or content) whilst preventing all spam links or irrelevant comments from being viewable to the site's owner and visitors.

== See also ==
- Social spam – Spam on social networking services
