= Peter Francis-Macrae =

- Born: 10 February 1982 (age 44); Cambridge, England
- Conviction: Fraudulent trading

Peter Clifford "Weaselboy" Francis-Macrae (born 10 February 1982, in Cambridge) is an English spammer found guilty of two counts of fraudulent trading, one of concealing criminal property, two of making threats to kill, one charge of threatening to destroy or damage property and one count of blackmail. He was running his own internet business from his father's home in St Neots, Cambridgeshire, most recent accounts filed at Companies House showed his business had a turnover of £49,000.

Macrae had been operating various Internet based businesses since 1998, starting with an offer made on several USENET groups for an automatic e-mail sending program (Macrae has since denied being the poster of the messages). Among the businesses he founded were the Internet service providers True Hosting, Expert Hosting and Dot Com Avenue. These businesses promised unrealistic up-times, when in fact they were frequently unavailable. When working with customers, Macrae used a number of aliases, most notably 'David Jarvis', and would claim to be persons from various departments of the companies; in fact, however, Macrae's businesses were operated solely by Macrae himself.

It was during his time running True Hosting that he earned the nickname 'Weaselboy' from an irate customer, whom Macrae had continued billing for web hosting after she had tried repeatedly to cancel services.

Under the business name EU Registry Services, Macrae had offered thousands of e-mail and website names in the .eu Top Level Domain when he had no right to do so. When Nominet warned him about his activities, he threatened to attack their servers. He was accused of his activities in 2004, and on 16 November 2005 it was announced in the press that Macrae had been sentenced to jail for six years.

In February 2006 he was found guilty of threatening to kill police officers and blow up the Cambridgeshire force's headquarters in a letter to his solicitor from his prison cell. Judge Nicholas Coleman said: "I am deeply concerned about what this man claims he is going to do on his release."

He ordered Francis-Macrae undergo psychiatric reports before sentencing.

In June 2006 he was given an additional 12 months sentence for making threats against the police, and made subject to an ASBO.

In October 2006, Peterborough Crown Court was told that the Crown Prosecution Service is attempting to seek out and confiscate more than £1 million. Francis-Macrae disrupted the hearing by screaming "I’m innocent", "this is a sham," and "al-Qaeda", repeatedly as loud as he could.

In February 2008 he was ordered to pay back £562,000 or face an additional 3 years in jail. Police had traced a Harrods Safe deposit box belonging to him, but all it contained were bricks, a mocking handwritten note with a smiley face and ten pounds.

While Macrae has been accused of several other illegal or illegitimate practices, including spamming and sending false letters under other ISPs' names to clients of said companies claiming that services were to be transferred to another company (owned by Macrae), the full extent of his actions are not known to the authorities.
