= Christopher William Smith =

American convicted criminal

Chris Smith
- Born: January 28, 1980 (age 46); Minneapolis-Saint Paul
- Other name: "Rizler"
- Known for: spammer
- Spouse: Anita Smith
- Children: one son

Christopher William Smith ("Rizler") (born January 28, 1980) is an American convicted criminal who was a prolific e-mail spammer, and sold drugs online from his illegal Xpress Pharmacy Direct in Burnsville, Minnesota, United States. He was released from prison on October 13, 2020.

== Early life ==
Smith grew up in the Minneapolis-Saint Paul area, splitting his time between his father's house on Lake Minnetonka and his mother's house in Burnsville. He attended high school at the Academy of Holy Angels and later transferred to a public school in Lakeville, but never completed high school.

== Business and conviction ==
He was charged in August 2005 with conspiracy to distribute controlled substances, wire fraud, selling misbranded drugs and money laundering. Federal officials added a count of operating a continuing criminal enterprise in a revised indictment filed in May 2006. During his final year in business he earned $18 million and had an 85-employee company. In addition, he violated court order by leaving the country and withdrawing frozen assets after having his bail revoked.

In January 2006, Smith was, in a separate case, ordered to pay AOL $5.6 million (or $25,000 for every day he sent out spam e-mails) for spamming its members in 2003.

In October 2006, Dr. Phillip Mach, who wrote the prescriptions for Smith's customers, pleaded guilty on one count of conspiracy to distribute and dispense controlled substances, four counts of wire fraud, three counts of unlawful distribution and dispensing of a controlled substance, and five counts of introducing misbranded drugs into interstate commerce.

In November 2006, Smith was convicted on nine counts by a federal jury in Minneapolis. On August 1, 2009 he was sentenced to 20 years in prison.

According to the Federal Bureau of Prisons, Smith (ID # 12310-041) was housed at the Federal Correctional Institution, Phoenix, but as of 2012 was moved to United States Penitentiary, Canaan and his projected release date was 31 July 2023. As of August 17, 2014 Smith was incarcerated at the Federal Correctional Complex, Allenwood in White Deer, PA, but has since been moved first to Federal Correctional Complex, Terre Haute, and then in 2015 to Federal Medical Center, Lexington, a federal prison for inmates requiring medical or mental health care. His projected release date was to be extended to 3 February 2024, but he was released from prison on 13 October 2020.

== See also ==
- List of spammers
