= Ryan Pitylak =

American businessperson

- Born: 1982 (age 43–44)
- Education: University of Texas
- Occupations: Executive Vice President, NinjaTrader

Ryan Pitylak (born 1982) is an American entrepreneur and executive vice president of NinjaTrader, an online platform for futures trading.

He is a co-founder of Unique Influence, a digital marketing consulting firm that was acquired by Assembly, and ZenBusiness, a start up business platform public-benefit corporation. Pitylak is a former internet spammer, later launching Pitylak Security, an anti-spam consulting internet security company.

== Education and early career ==
Pitylak is a graduate of the University of Texas, where he received undergraduate degrees in economics and philosophy. In May 2006, Pitylak reached settlements with the state of Texas and Microsoft, where he admitted to "sending 25 million e-mails every day at the height of his spamming operation in 2004" and paid out over $1 million. In June 2006, he launched Pitylak Security, an Internet security company that focused on anti-spam consulting.

== Career ==
=== Unique Influence ===
Pitylak is the former chief executive officer of Unique Influence, a digital marketing consulting firm he co-founded in 2011. In 2015, Unique Influence was acquired by Assembly.

=== ZenBusiness ===
Pitylak co-founded ZenBusiness in 2015, a start up business platform public-benefit corporation based in Austin, Texas, to encourage entrepreneurial microbusinesses. In 2020, the company secured $55 million in Series-B funding. At the time of Pitylak's exit from the company, ZenBusiness had earned a valuation of $1.7 billion, securing $275 million in funding.

=== NinjaTrader ===
In May 2024, it was reported that Pitylak joined NinjaTrader, an online platform for futures trading, becoming its Executive Vice President of Growth.

== See also ==
- List of spammers
