= Kevin Fox (designer) =

- Occupation: User experience designer
- Website: kfury.com

Kevin Fox is the user experience designer who created the interface for Gmail 1.0, Google Calendar, Google Reader, and Friendfeed.

Fox was senior user experience design lead at Google from 2003 until 2008, when he left the company.

He was a co-founder of the Internet of Things startup Electric Imp in 2012. The startup was acquired by Twilio in 2020. Since 2015 he has been the chief experience officer at Evan Prodromou's fuzzy.io.
