= Sanford Wallace =

American internet spammer (born 1968)

Sanford 'Spamford' Wallace (born c. 1968) is an Internet spammer. He initially sent junk faxes before coming to notoriety in 1997, promoting himself as the original "Spam King". Wallace's prolific spamming has resulted in encounters with the United States government, anti-spam activists, and large corporations such as Facebook and MySpace.

== Early career ==
In the late 1990s, his company, Cyber Promotions, aka Cyberpromo, was widely blacklisted as a source of unsolicited email. Wallace's high-profile pro-spam stance and unrepentant persistence earned him the derisive nickname 'Spamford'.

Prior to his email spam ventures, Wallace had gained notoriety in other questionable marketing circles, as a heavy utilizer of junk fax marketing, a practice outlawed in the United States since 1991.

In 1995, Wallace formed Cyber Promotions, entering the spam market. Thanks to a self-marketing campaign, Cyberpromo rapidly became the most successful seller of email marketing—as well as the number one source of unsolicited email. In 1996 he was sued by Concentric Network, an ISP, and entered into a consent decree not to use their network again. After Cyberpromo failed to become a legitimate business, Wallace returned to junk faxing in late 1997.

Wallace's company brought a number of spam-blocking evasion tactics to the fore of the spam battle. False return addresses, relaying, and multihoming were among the questionable practices used by Cyberpromo to ensure the penetration of their advertising.

== Retirement and reemergence ==
In April 1998, Wallace publicly announced that he was quitting the spam business. Cyberpromo was converted to what he claimed was an "opt-in" email marketing company and renamed GTMI. The revised company was plagued by major financial problems, as well as the spectre of its former self, with large numbers of people unconvinced of Wallace's change of heart. Wallace pulled out of the new venture quickly. GTMI's problematic origin led to its rapid demise.

After Wallace's internet connection was disconnected for spamming in 1999, he filed a lawsuit against anti-spam activist Mark Welch, but abandoned the suit a month later.

As of October 2003, Wallace was working as a DJ in New Hampshire, making weekly appearances at area nightclubs. Wallace performed under the name DJ MasterWeb. He was also the owner of a night club in New Hampshire called Plum Crazy, which filed for bankruptcy in 2004. It appears that Wallace did not leave the Internet marketing business entirely. In 2001 he was linked to a website, passthison.com, which utilized multiple-window launching to snag Web viewers, an advertising practice rarely seen outside of the online pornography industry. Wallace was also involved in another opt-in project, SmartBotPRO.NET, which is now apparently also defunct.

On October 8, 2004, the Federal Trade Commission filed suit against Wallace and his company, SmartBOT, for infecting computers with spyware then offering a solution to remove the problem for $30. In January 2005, it was announced that Wallace had agreed to stop distributing the software until the charges with the FTC are settled. Subsequently, a default judgment was issued against Wallace forbidding him and associates from distributing spyware or any other software without consumer's consent.

In March 2006, the FTC filed a suit again against Wallace and SmartBOT for practices similar to the 2004 suit. This time Wallace and his co-defendants were ordered to pay $5,089,550.48 in fines.

In 2007, MySpace filed suit against Wallace for phishing and spamming. Wallace had used automated software not allowed by MySpace to create 11,000 fake profiles, in order to direct MySpace users to other websites. In July 2007, US District Judge Audrey B. Collins issued an order prohibiting Wallace from creating or maintaining MySpace profiles, and from using MySpace to post public comments, or send private messages. In April 2008, the California Central District Court issued a default judgment against Wallace in MySpace's lawsuit, after Wallace failed to turn over documents or appear in court.

On January 26, 2008, The Register reported that the FTC has asked the Judge overseeing the 2006 settlement to find Wallace and partner Walter Rines in civil contempt of court for their use of malware and social engineering on MySpace to promote porn and gambling sites. In May 2008 Wallace and Rines were ordered to pay $230 million to MySpace by the L.A. District Court when they failed to appear for trial.

Facebook sued Wallace in California District Court for posting spam messages on members' walls. Wallace has already been fined $4 million for installing ad-related spyware on peoples' computers, and was fined $230 million for his activities on MySpace, according to MediaPost.

Wallace filed for bankruptcy in June 2009. On October 29, 2009, federal judge Jeremy D. Fogel awarded Facebook $711 million in damages. Although Facebook believed it was unlikely to collect due to Wallace's bankruptcy, the presiding judge in the case also recommended criminal contempt charges against Wallace, which carry the possibility of incarceration.

On August 4, 2011, Wallace was indicted by a federal grand jury in San Jose, California, on various counts of electronic mail fraud, intentional damage to a protected computer, and criminal contempt. The indictment followed a two-year investigation by the FBI into his alleged infiltration of Facebook accounts in order to spam its users. Wallace denied the charges and was released on $100,000 bail.

In August 2015, Wallace pleaded guilty to electronic mail fraud and criminal contempt of court as well as admitting to mass spamming in 2008 and 2009. He also pleaded guilty to violating a court order to not access Facebook's computer network.

== Conviction ==
In June 2016, Wallace was sentenced to thirty months in prison and ordered to pay hundreds of thousands of dollars in restitution for bombarding Facebook users. U.S. District Court Judge Edward J. Davila also sentenced Wallace to mental health treatment and five years of probation once he is released. Judge Davila barred Sanford Wallace of possessing or using any computer without the permission of the probation order. He pleaded guilty to one count of fraud and related activity in connection with electronic mail and one count of criminal contempt of court.

Wallace served his sentence in Colorado, where he was assigned Federal Bureau of Prisons inmate number 16075-111. He was released from prison on May 21, 2018, after serving 21 months.

== See also ==
- Oleg Nikolaenko
- Leo Kuvayev
- List of Ig Nobel Prize winners
