= Guestbook =

Means for a visitor to acknowledge a visit to a location/website

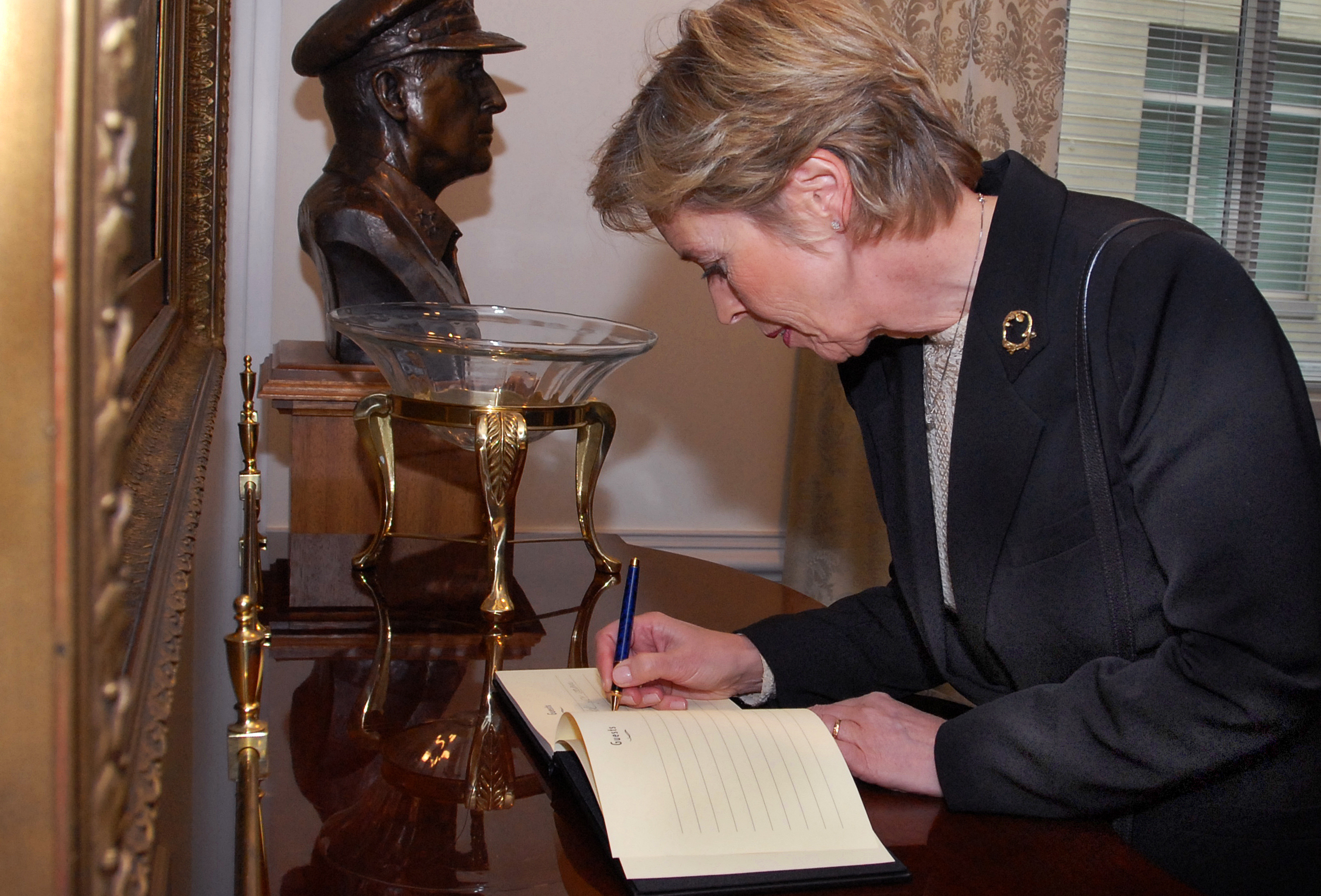
Norwegian Minister of Defense Anne-Grete Strøm-Erichsen signs a guestbook at the Pentagon in 2007

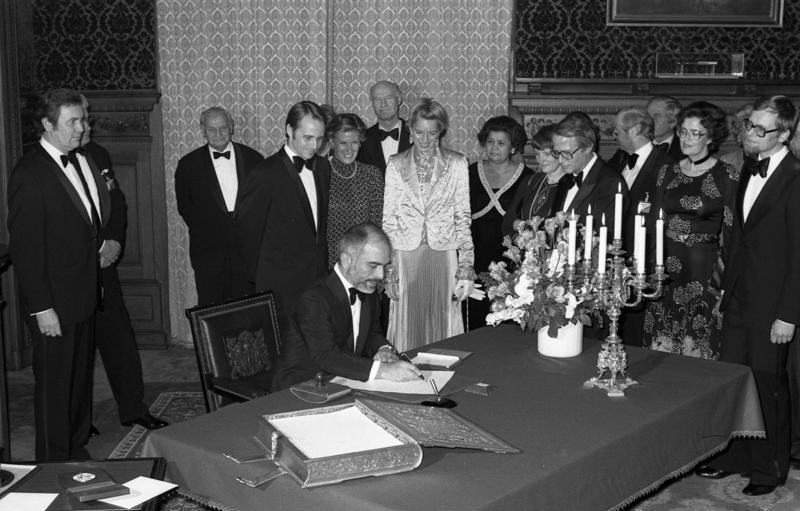
Hussein of Jordan signs the Golden Book of Hamburg.

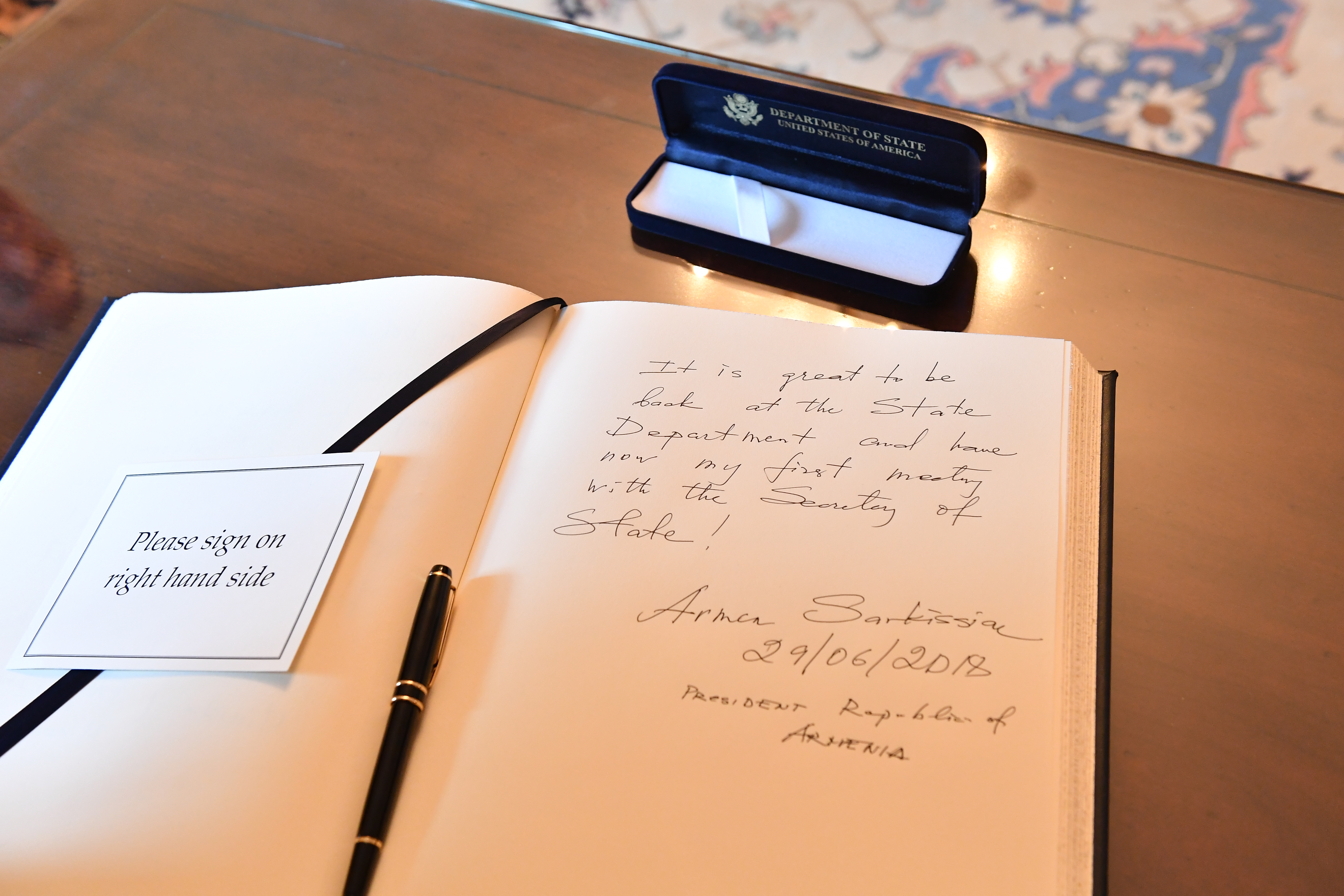
Armenian President Armen Sarkissian signs the guestbook at the Department of State.

A guestbook (also guest book, visitor log, visitors' book, visitors' album) is a paper or electronic means for a visitor to acknowledge a visit to a site, physical or web-based, and leave details such as their name, postal or electronic address and any comments. In contemporary contexts, electronic guestbooks are also used to collect richer contributions such as photos or videos, particularly during social or cultural events.

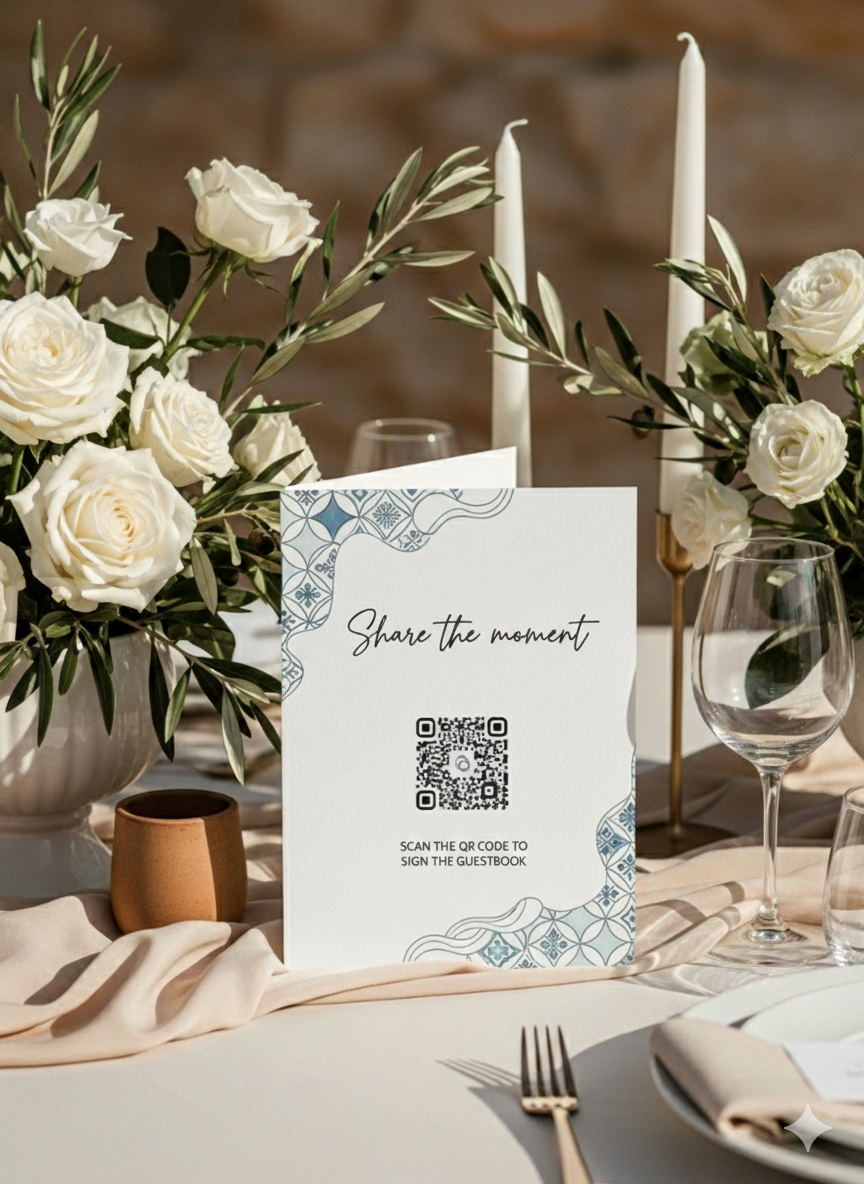
QR code sign used to access an online guestbook at an event

Such paper-based ledgers or books are traditional in churches, at weddings, funerals, B&Bs, museums, schools, institutions and other private facilities open to the public. Some private homes keep visitors' books. Specialised forms of guestbooks include hotel registers, wherein guests are required to provide their contact information, and Books of Condolence, which are used at funeral homes and more generally after notable public deaths, such as the death of a monarch or president, or after a public disaster, such as an airplane crash.

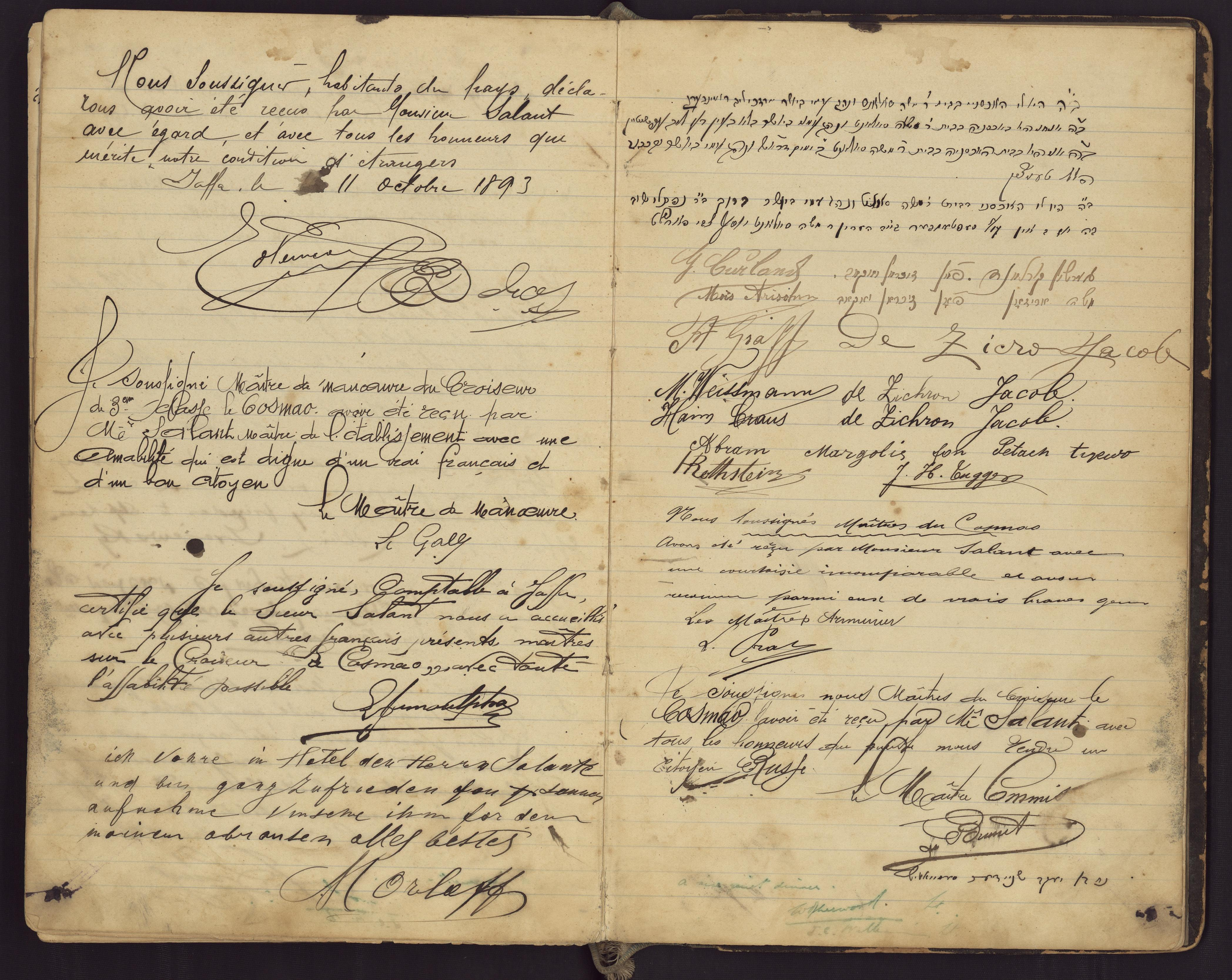
A guestbook from the Salant Hotel, held by the National Library of Israel

On the web, a guestbook is a logging system that allows visitors of a website to leave a public comment. It is possible in some guestbooks for visitors to express their thoughts about the website or its subject. Generally, they do not require the poster to create a user account, as it is an informal method of dropping off a quick message. The purpose of a website guestbook is to display the kind of visitors the site gets, including the part of the world they reside in, and gain feedback from them. This allows the website owner to assess and improve their site. A guestbook is generally a script, which is usually remotely hosted and written in a language such as Perl, PHP, Python or ASP. Many free guestbook hosts and scripts exist.

Names and addresses provided in guestbooks, paper-based or electronic, are frequently recorded and collated for use in providing statistics about visitors to the site, and to contact visitors to the site in the future. Because guestbooks are considered ephemeral objects, historians, literary scholars and other academic researchers have been increasingly eager to identify and help conserve them.
