= Robert Soloway =

Robert Alan Soloway (born 1980) is the founder of the so-called "Strategic Partnership Against Microsoft Illegal Spam," or SPAMIS, but is said to be one of the Internet's biggest spammers through his company, Newport Internet Marketing (NIM). He was arrested on May 30, 2007, after a grand jury indicted him on charges of identity theft, money laundering, and mail, wire, and e-mail fraud. He was nicknamed the "Spam King" by prosecutors.

== Spamming tactics ==
Soloway is charged with using hijacked zombie computers and spoofing to send out millions of spam e-mails since 2003. Some e-mails sent by Soloway's company contained false header information making them appear to have been sent from MSN and Hotmail addresses. As a result of this he was sued by Microsoft and ordered to pay $7 million in damages in December 2003. He also was sued by a small Oklahoma company and was ordered to pay $10 million in damages.

However, an injunction to cease his activities did not stop him from spamming: Soloway's company was responsible, from around June 2004 until April 2005, for a spam campaign (sent from open proxies) on behalf of various websites including broadcastingtoday.biz and broadcastadvertise.org (all since suspended), which promised to send recipients' Web site addresses to several million "opt-in email addresses." He later claimed that as the service was free, the campaign was not illegal under the anti-spam law CAN-SPAM. A disclaimer in the spams stated, "the above emailing is only free if you are a nonprofit organization that aids child abuse victims."

Soloway insisted that NIM removed all MSN and Hotmail addresses from his mailing lists. He asserted that it was his company's subcontractors, or "spam affiliates", who had carried out the illegal activity (though he remained liable under both state and federal laws, including Washington's Commercial Electronic Mail Act and CAN-SPAM). He insisted he had fired all his subcontractors (none of whom he named) and had himself taken charge of emailing, using spam program Dark Mailer. However, a Washington superior court judge ruled that Soloway was in default.

Soloway pleaded guilty to three counts on 14 March 2008. He formerly operated a company based in Seattle, Washington which he is calling "Broadcast E-mail Service" that offers "mailing services" by contract as well as a software program which the site promises will allow the buyer to "email your Web site to 2,500,000 opt-in email addresses for free." E-mails advertising Soloway's company have been sent with forged headers (the headers purport to be "from" the person they were sent "to").

Soloway reportedly switched IP addresses for his Web sites to avoid detection. In 2006 he registered them through Chinese internet service providers (ISP) in an apparent ploy to mask his involvement.

== Legal troubles ==
=== 2005 judgments ===
In 2005, Microsoft won a $7.8 million civil judgment against Soloway, for spam sent through MSN and Hotmail services. That money, however, was never collected because Soloway's bank accounts remained elusive.

Later in 2005, Robert Braver, an internet services provider based in Oklahoma, was awarded $10,075,000.00 in another spam-related case against Soloway. In this lawsuit, a permanent injunction was issued against Soloway, enjoining him from further spam activities.

Those judgments, however, did not stop Soloway's illegal spamming; in fact, he mocked them.

=== Arrested in May 2007 ===
He was arrested on May 30, 2007, after a federal grand jury indicted him on 35 charges including mail fraud, wire fraud, e-mail fraud, identity theft and money laundering. If convicted as charged, he could have faced decades in prison. Prosecutors wanted to seize $773,000 that Soloway made from his firm.

=== Pleaded guilty in March 2008 ===
On March 14, 2008, Robert Soloway reached an agreement with federal prosecutors, two weeks before his scheduled trial on 40 charges. Soloway pleaded guilty to three charges—felony mail fraud, fraud in connection with e-mail, and failing to file a 2005 tax return. In exchange, federal prosecutors dropped all other charges. Soloway faced up to 27 years in prison on the most serious charge, and up to $625,000 total in fines.

=== Prison sentence ===
On 22 July 2008 Robert Soloway was sentenced to 47 months in federal prison, and ordered to repay over $700,000. Prosecutors had asked for a 9-year sentence. As of March 2011, he is out of prison and on probation. Part of his probation terms include monitoring of all his email and web browsing.

== See also ==
- List of spammers
