= Timeline of malware =

Computer malware timeline

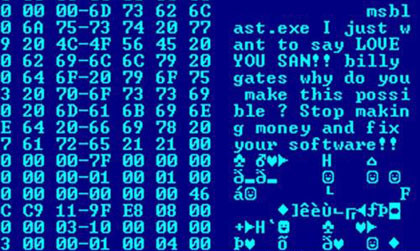
Hex dump of the Blaster worm, showing a message left for Microsoft co-founder Bill Gates by the worm's programmer

This timeline of computer viruses and worms presents a chronological timeline of noteworthy computer viruses, computer worms, Trojan horses, similar malware, related research and events.

== 1960s ==
=== 1966 ===
- John von Neumann's article on the "Theory of self-reproducing automata" is published in 1966. The article is based on lectures given by von Neumann at the University of Illinois about the "Theory and Organization of Complicated Automata" in 1949.

== 1970s ==
=== 1970 ===
- The first story written about a computer virus, The Scarred Man by Gregory Benford, was published in the May 1970 issue of Venture Science Fiction.

=== 1971 ===
- The Creeper system, an experimental self-replicating program, is written by Bob Thomas at BBN Technologies to test John von Neumann's theory. Creeper infected DEC PDP-10 computers running the TENEX operating system. Creeper gained access via the ARPANET and copied itself to the remote system where the message "I'm the creeper : catch me if you can!" was displayed. The Reaper program was later created to delete Creeper.
- At the University of Illinois at Urbana-Champaign, a graduate student named Alan Davis (working for Prof. Donald Gillies) created a process on a PDP-11 that (a) checked to see if an identical copy of itself was currently running as an active process, and if not, created a copy of itself and started it running; (b) checked to see if any disk space (which all users shared) was available, and if so, created a file the size of that space; and (c) looped back to step (a). As a result, the process stole all available disk space. When users tried to save files, the operating system advised them that the disk was full and that they needed to delete some existing files. Of course, if they did delete a file, this process would immediately snatch up the available space. When users called in a system administrator to fix the problem, he examined the active processes, discovered the offending process, and deleted it. Of course, before he left the room, the still existing process would create another copy of itself, and the problem would not go away. The only way to make the computer work again was to reboot.

=== 1972 ===
- The science fiction novel, When HARLIE Was One, by David Gerrold, contains one of the first fictional representations of a computer virus, as well as one of the first uses of the word "virus" to denote a program that infects a computer.

=== 1973 ===
- In fiction, the 1973 Michael Crichton movie Westworld made an early mention of the concept of a computer virus, being a central plot theme that causes androids to run amok. Alan Oppenheimer's character summarizes the problem by stating that "[...] there's a clear pattern here which suggests an analogy to an infectious disease process, spreading from one [...] area to the next." To which the replies are stated: "Perhaps there are superficial similarities to disease" and, "I must confess I find it difficult to believe in a disease of machinery." (Note: Crichton's earlier work, the 1969 novel The Andromeda Strain and 1971 film were about an extraterrestrial biological virus-like disease that threatened the human race.)

=== 1974 ===
- The Rabbit (or Wabbit) virus, more a fork bomb than a virus, is written. The Rabbit virus makes multiple copies of itself on a single computer (and was named "rabbit" for the speed at which it did so) until it clogs the system, reducing system performance, before finally reaching a threshold and crashing the computer.

=== 1975 ===
- April: ANIMAL is written by John Walker for the UNIVAC 1108. ANIMAL asked several questions of the user in an attempt to guess the type of animal the user was thinking of, while the related program PERVADE would create a copy of itself and ANIMAL in every directory to which the current user had access. It spread across the multi-user UNIVACs when users with overlapping permissions discovered the game, and to other computers when tapes were shared. The program was carefully written to avoid damaging existing file or directory structures, and to avoid copying itself if permissions did not exist or if harm would result. Its spread was halted by an OS upgrade that changed the format of the file status tables PERVADE used. Though non-malicious, "Pervading Animal" represents the first Trojan "in the wild".
- The novel The Shockwave Rider by John Brunner is published, coining the word "worm" to describe a program that propagates itself through a computer network.

=== 1977 ===
- The Adolescence of P-1 novel describes a worm program that propagates through modem-based networks, eventually developing its own strategy-developing AI, which deals with cross-hardware and cross-os issues, eventually infecting hardware manufacturers and defense organizations.

== 1980s ==
=== 1982 ===
- A program called Elk Cloner, written for Apple II systems, was created by Mt. Lebanon High School student Richard Skrenta, originally as a prank. The Apple II was particularly vulnerable due to the need for a floppy disk to be present in order to bootstrap the computer. Elk Cloner's design combined with the public's general lack of knowledge regarding malware and how to protect against it led to Elk Cloner being responsible for the first computer virus outbreak in history.

=== 1983 ===
- November: The term "virus" is re-coined by Frederick B. Cohen in describing self-replicating computer programs. In 1984 Cohen uses the phrase "computer virus" (suggested by his teacher Leonard Adleman) to describe the operation of such programs in terms of "infection". He defines a "virus" as "a program that can 'infect' other programs by modifying them to include a possibly evolved copy of itself." Cohen demonstrates a virus-like program on a VAX11/750 system at Lehigh University. The program could install itself in, or infect, other system objects.

=== 1984 ===
- August: Ken Thompson publishes his seminal paper, "Reflections on Trusting Trust", in which he describes how he modified a C compiler so that when used to compile a specific version of the Unix operating system, it inserts a backdoor into the login command, and when used to compile a new copy of itself, it inserts the backdoor insertion code, even if neither the backdoor nor the backdoor insertion code is present in the source code of this new copy.

=== 1986 ===
- January: The Brain boot sector virus is released. Brain is considered the first IBM PC compatible virus, and the program responsible for the first IBM PC compatible virus epidemic. The virus is also known as Lahore, Pakistani, Pakistani Brain, and Pakistani flu as it was created in Lahore, Pakistan, by 19-year-old Pakistani programmer Basit Farooq Alvi and his brother, Amjad Farooq Alvi.
- December: Ralf Burger presented the Virdem model of programs at a meeting of the underground Chaos Computer Club in Germany. The Virdem model represented the first programs that could replicate themselves via addition of their code to executable DOS files in COM format.

=== 1987 ===
- Appearance of the Vienna virus, which was subsequently neutralized – the first time this had happened on the IBM platform.
- Appearance of Lehigh virus (discovered at its namesake university), boot sector viruses such as Yale from the US, Stoned from New Zealand, Ping Pong from Italy, and appearance of the first self-encrypting file virus, Cascade. Lehigh was stopped on campus before it spread to the "wild" (to computers beyond the university), and as a result, has never been found elsewhere. A subsequent infection of Cascade in the offices of IBM Belgium led to IBM responding with its own antivirus product development. Prior to this, antivirus solutions developed at IBM were intended for staff use only.
- October: The Jerusalem virus, part of the (at that time unknown) Suriv family, is detected in the city of Jerusalem. The virus destroys all executable files on infected machines upon every occurrence of Friday the 13th (except Friday 13 November 1987 making its first trigger date May 13, 1988). Jerusalem caused a worldwide epidemic in 1988.
- November: The SCA virus, a boot sector virus for Amiga computers, appears. It immediately creates a pandemic virus-writer storm. A short time later, SCA releases another, considerably more destructive virus, the Byte Bandit.
- December: Christmas Tree EXEC was the first widely disruptive replicating network program, which paralyzed several international computer networks in December 1987. It was written in Rexx on the VM/CMS operating system and originated in West Germany. It re-emerged in 1990.

=== 1988 ===
- March 1: The Ping-Pong virus (also called Boot, Bouncing Ball, Bouncing Dot, Italian, Italian-A or VeraCruz), an MS-DOS boot sector virus, is discovered at the University of Turin in Italy.
- June: The CyberAIDS and Festering Hate Apple ProDOS viruses spread from underground pirate BBS systems and start infecting mainstream networks. Festering Hate was the last iteration of the CyberAIDS series extending back to 1985 and 1986. Unlike the few Apple viruses that had come before which were essentially annoying, but did no damage, the Festering Hate series of viruses was extremely destructive, spreading to all system files it could find on the host computer (hard drive, floppy, and system memory) and then destroying everything when it could no longer find any uninfected files.
- November 2: The Morris worm, created by Robert Tappan Morris, infects DEC VAX and Sun machines running BSD UNIX that are connected to the Internet, and becomes the first worm to spread extensively "in the wild", and one of the first well-known programs exploiting buffer overrun vulnerabilities.
- December: The Father Christmas worm attacks DEC VAX machines running VMS that are connected to the DECnet Internet (an international scientific research network using DECnet protocols), affecting NASA and other research centers. Its purpose was to deliver a Christmas greeting to all affected users.

=== 1989 ===
- October: Ghostball, the first multipartite virus, is discovered by Friðrik Skúlason. It infects both executable .COM files and boot sectors on MS-DOS systems.
- December: Several thousand floppy disks containing the AIDS Trojan, the first known ransomware, are mailed to subscribers of PC Business World magazine and a WHO AIDS conference mailing list. This DOS Trojan lies dormant for 90 boot cycles, then encrypts all filenames on the system, displaying a notice asking for $189 to be sent to a post office box in Panama in order to receive a decryption program.

== 1990s ==
=== 1990 ===
- Mark Washburn, working on an analysis of the Vienna and Cascade viruses with Ralf Burger, develops the first family of polymorphic viruses, the Chameleon family. Chameleon series debuted with the release of 1260.
- June: The Form computer virus is isolated in Switzerland. It would remain in the wild for almost 20 years and reappear afterward; during the 1990s it tended to be the most common virus in the wild with 20 to more than 50 percent of reported infections.

=== 1991 ===
- Mattel releases a toyline called "Computer Warriors," bringing computer viruses into mainstream media. The villain, Megahert, is a sentient computer virus.

=== 1992 ===
- March: The Michelangelo virus was expected to create a digital apocalypse on March 6, with millions of computers having their information wiped, according to mass media hysteria surrounding the virus. Later assessments of the damage showed the aftermath to be minimal. John McAfee had been quoted by the media as saying that five million computers would be affected. He later said that pressed by the interviewer to come up with a number, he had estimated a range from five thousand to five million, but the media naturally went with just the higher number.
- October: Milton-Bradley releases Omega Virus, a board game containing one of the first examples of a sentient computer virus in mainstream media.

=== 1993 ===
- "Leandro" or "Leandro & Kelly" and "Freddy Krueger" spread quickly due to popularity of BBS and shareware distribution.
- October: The X Files, "Ghost in the Machine" airs. A renowned computer programmer must write a virus to destroy the AI system he created. The virus is inserted via a 3½-inch floppy disk.

=== 1994 ===
- April: OneHalf is a DOS-based polymorphic computer virus.
- September: ReBoot first airs, containing another memorable fictional, sentient computer virus, Megabyte.

=== 1995 ===
- The first Macro virus, called "Concept", is created. It attacked Microsoft Word documents.

=== 1996 ===
- "Ply" – DOS 16-bit based complicated polymorphic virus appeared with a built-in permutation engine.
- Boza, the first virus designed specifically for Windows 95 files arrives.
- Laroux, the first Excel macro virus, appears.
- Staog, the first Linux virus, attacks Linux machines.

=== 1997 ===
- Esperanto, the first cross-platform virus, appears.

=== 1998 ===
- June 2: The first version of the CIH virus appears. It is the first known virus able to erase flash ROM BIOS content.

=== 1999 ===
- January 20: The Happy99 worm first appeared. It invisibly attaches itself to emails, displays fireworks to hide the changes being made, and wishes the user a happy New Year. It modifies system files related to Outlook Express and Internet Explorer (IE) on Windows 95 and Windows 98.
- February : The Sub7 is released targeting the Windows 9x and on the Windows NT family of operating systems.
- March 26: The Melissa virus was released, targeting Microsoft Word and Outlook-based systems, and creating considerable network traffic.
- June 6: The ExploreZip worm, which destroys Microsoft Office documents, was first detected.
- September: the CTX virus is isolated
- December 30: The Kak worm is a JavaScript computer worm that spread itself by exploiting a bug in Outlook Express.

== 2000s ==
=== 2000 ===
- May 5: The ILOVEYOU worm (also known as the Love Letter, VBS, or Love Bug worm), a computer worm written in VBScript and using social engineering techniques, infected millions of Windows computers worldwide within a few hours of its release.
- June 28: The Pikachu virus is believed to be the first computer virus geared at children. It contains the character "Pikachu" from the Pokémon series. The operating systems affected by this worm are Windows 95, Windows 98, and Windows ME.
- The Y2K bug, or millennium bug, was the potential for computer systems to malfunction when the year changed from 1999 to 2000 because many programs used only two digits to represent the year. This caused fears that "00" would be interpreted as 1900, potentially causing chaos in critical systems like power grids and banks. Extensive, global remediation efforts costing billions were undertaken to fix the problem, and the transition passed smoothly.

=== 2001 ===
- February 11: The Anna Kournikova virus hits e-mail servers hard by sending e-mail to contacts in the Microsoft Outlook addressbook. Its creator, Jan de Wit, was sentenced to 150 hours of community service.
- March 13: Magistr, also called Disembowler, is discovered. It is a complex email worm for Windows systems with multiple payloads that trigger months apart from each other. It targets members of the Law profession by searching the files on a user's computer for various keywords relating to court proceedings, activating if such are found.
- May 8: The Sadmind worm spreads by exploiting holes in both Sun Solaris and Microsoft IIS.
- July: The Sircam worm is released, spreading through Microsoft systems via e-mail and unprotected network shares.
- July 13: The Code Red worm attacking the Index Server ISAPI Extension in Microsoft Internet Information Services is released.
- August 4: A complete re-write of the Code Red worm, Code Red II begins aggressively spreading onto Microsoft systems, primarily in China.
- September 18: The Nimda worm is discovered and spreads through a variety of means including vulnerabilities in Microsoft Windows and backdoors left by Code Red II and Sadmind worm.
- October 26: The Klez worm is first identified. It exploits a vulnerability in Microsoft Internet Explorer and Microsoft Outlook and Outlook Express.

=== 2002 ===
- February 11: The Simile virus is a metamorphic computer virus written in assembly.
- Beast is a Windows-based backdoor Trojan horse, more commonly known as a RAT (Remote Administration Tool). It is capable of infecting almost all versions of Windows. Written in Delphi and released first by its author Tataye in 2002, its most current version was released on October 3, 2004.
- March 7: Mylife is a computer worm that spread itself by sending malicious emails to all the contacts in Microsoft Outlook.

=== 2003 ===
- January 24: The SQL Slammer worm, aka Sapphire worm, Helkern and other names, attacks vulnerabilities in Microsoft SQL Server and MSDE becomes the fastest spreading worm of all time (measured by doubling time at the peak rate of growth), causing massive Internet access disruptions worldwide just fifteen minutes after infecting its first victim.
- April 2: Graybird is a trojan horse also known as Backdoor.Graybird.
- June 13: ProRat is a Turkish-made Microsoft Windows based backdoor trojan horse, more commonly known as a RAT (Remote Administration Tool).
- August 12: The Blaster worm, aka the Lovesan worm, rapidly spreads by exploiting a vulnerability in system services present on Windows computers.
- August 18: The Welchia (Nachi) worm is discovered. The worm tries to remove the Blaster worm and patch Windows.
- August 19: The Sobig worm (technically the Sobig.F worm) spreads rapidly through Microsoft systems via mail and network shares.
- September 18: Swen is a computer worm written in C++.
- October 24: The Sober worm is first seen on Microsoft systems and maintains its presence until 2005 with many new variants. The simultaneous attacks on network weak points by the Blaster and Sobig worms cause massive damage.
- November 10: Agobot is a computer worm that can spread itself by exploiting vulnerabilities on Microsoft Windows. Some of the vulnerabilities are MS03-026 and MS05-039.
- November 20: Bolgimo is a computer worm that spread itself by exploiting a buffer overflow vulnerability at Microsoft Windows DCOM RPC Interface (CVE-2003-0352).

=== 2004 ===
- January 18: Bagle is a mass-mailing worm affecting all versions of Microsoft Windows. There were two variants of Bagle worm, Bagle.A and Bagle.B. Bagle.B was discovered on February 17, 2004.
- January 26: The MyDoom worm emerges, and currently holds the record for the fastest-spreading mass mailer worm. The worm was most notable for performing a distributed denial-of-service (DDoS) attack on www.sco.com, which belonged to The SCO Group.
- February 16: The Netsky worm is discovered. The worm spreads by email and by copying itself to folders on the local hard drive as well as on mapped network drives if available. Many variants of the Netsky worm appeared.
- March 19: The Witty worm is a record-breaking worm in many regards. It exploited holes in several Internet Security Systems (ISS) products. It spread rapidly using a pre-populated list of ground-zero hosts.
- May 1: The Sasser worm emerges by exploiting a vulnerability in the Microsoft Windows LSASS service and causes problems in networks, while removing MyDoom and Bagle variants, even interrupting business.
- June 15: Caribe or Cabir is a computer worm that is designed to infect mobile phones that run Symbian OS. It is the first computer worm that can infect mobile phones. It spread itself through Bluetooth.
- August 16: Nuclear RAT (short for Nuclear Remote Administration Tool) is a backdoor trojan that infects Windows NT family systems (Windows 2000, Windows XP, Windows 2003).
- August 20: Vundo, or the Vundo Trojan (also known as Virtumonde or Virtumondo and sometimes referred to as MS Juan) is a trojan known to cause popups and advertising for rogue antispyware programs, and sporadically other misbehavior including performance degradation and denial of service with some websites including Google and Facebook.
- October 12: Bifrost, also known as Bifrose, is a backdoor trojan which can infect Windows 95 through Vista. Bifrost uses the typical server, server builder, and client backdoor program configuration to allow a remote attack.
- October 24: Potentially the first Mac OS X malware, Opener/Renepo trojan discovered. Depending on definitions, it may have been preceded by MP3Concept in April of that year.
- December: Santy, the first known "webworm" is launched. It exploited a vulnerability in phpBB and used Google to find new targets. It infected around 40000 sites before Google filtered the search query used by the worm, preventing it from spreading.

=== 2005 ===
- July 2005: Fast16 is a highly sophiscated computer worm and rootkit that targeted high-precision calculation softwares running on Windows using an embedded LUA virtual machine. It was uncovered by SentinelOne in April 2026.
- August 2005: Zotob is a computer worm which exploits security vulnerabilities in Microsoft operating systems like Windows 2000, including the MS05-039 plug-and-play vulnerability (CVE-2005-1983). This worm has been known to spread on Microsoft-ds or TCP port 445.
- October 2005: The copy protection rootkit deliberately and surreptitiously included on music CDs sold by Sony BMG is exposed. The rootkit creates vulnerabilities on affected computers, making them susceptible to infection by worms and viruses.
- Late 2005: The Zlob Trojan, is a Trojan horse program that masquerades as a required video codec in the form of the Microsoft Windows ActiveX component. It was first detected in late 2005.

=== 2006 ===
- January 20: The Nyxem worm was discovered. It spread by mass-mailing. Its payload, which activates on the third of every month, starting on February 3, attempts to disable security-related and file-sharing software, and destroy files of certain types, such as Microsoft Office files.
- February 14: Discovery of the first-ever self-propagating malware for Mac OS X, a low-threat worm known as OSX/Leap-A or OSX/Oompa-A, is announced.
- Late March: Brontok variant N was found in late March. Brontok was a mass-email worm and the origin for the worm was from Indonesia.
- June: Starbucks is a virus that infects StarOffice and OpenOffice.
- Late September: Stration or Warezov worm first discovered.
- Development of Stuxnet is presumed to have been started between 2005 and 2006.

=== 2007 ===
- January 17: Storm Worm identified as a fast-spreading email spamming threat to Microsoft systems. It begins gathering infected computers into the Storm botnet. By around June 30, it had infected 1.7 million computers, and it had compromised between 1 and 10 million computers by September. Thought to have originated from Russia, it disguises itself as a news email containing a film about bogus news stories asking the user to download the attachment which it claims is a film.
- January: a worm named Xiong Mao Shao Xiang affected many Windows users in China.
- July: Zeus is a trojan that targets Microsoft Windows to steal banking information by keystroke logging.

=== 2008 ===
- February 17: Mocmex is a trojan, which was found in a digital photo frame in February 2008. It was the first serious computer virus on a digital photo frame. The virus was traced back to a group in China.
- March 3: Torpig, also known as Sinowal and Mebroot, is a Trojan horse that affects Windows, turning off anti-virus applications. It allows others to access the computer, modifies data, steals confidential information (such as user passwords and other sensitive data) and installs more malware on the victim's computer.
- May 6: Rustock.C, a hitherto-rumored spambot-type malware with advanced rootkit capabilities, was announced to have been detected on Microsoft systems and analyzed, having been in the wild and undetected since October 2007 at the very least.
- July 6: Bohmini.A is a configurable remote access tool or trojan that exploits security flaws in Adobe Flash 9.0.115 with Internet Explorer 7.0 and Firefox 2.0 under Windows XP SP2.
- July 31: The Koobface computer worm targets users of Facebook and Myspace. New variants constantly appear.
- November 21: Computer worm Conficker infected anywhere from 9 to 15 million Microsoft server systems running everything from Windows 2000 to the Windows 7 Beta. The French Navy, UK Ministry of Defence (including Royal Navy warships and submarines), Sheffield Hospital network, German Bundeswehr, and Norwegian Police were all affected among many others. Microsoft set a bounty of US$250,000 for information leading to the capture of the worm's author(s). Five main variants of the worm are known and have been dubbed Conficker A, B, C, D and E, increasingly adding self-defense mechanisms. They were discovered 21 November 2008, 29 December 2008, 20 February 2009, 4 March 2009, and 7 April 2009, respectively. On December 16, 2008, Microsoft releases KB958644 patching the server service vulnerability (CVE-2008-4250) responsible for the spread of Conficker.

=== 2009 ===
- July 4: The July 2009 cyber attacks occur and the W32.Dozer attack on the United States and South Korea emerges.
- July 15: Symantec discovers Daprosy Worm, a trojan worm intended to steal online game passwords in internet cafes by intercepting all keystrokes and sending them to its author.
- August 24: Source code for MegaPanzer is released by its author under GPLv3 and appears to have been detected in the wild.
- November 27: The virus Kenzero is a virus that spreads online from peer-to-peer networks (P2P) taking browsing history.

== 2010s ==
=== 2010 ===
- January: The Waledac botnet sent spam emails. In February 2010, an international group of security researchers and Microsoft took Waledac down.
- January: The Psyb0t worm is discovered. It is thought to be unique in that it can infect routers and high-speed modems.
- February 18: Microsoft announced that a BSoD problem on some Windows machines which was triggered by a batch of Patch Tuesday updates was caused by the Alureon Trojan.
- June 17: Stuxnet, a Windows Trojan, was detected. It is the first worm to attack SCADA systems. There are suggestions that it was designed to target Iranian nuclear facilities. It uses a valid certificate from Realtek.
- September 9: The virus, called "here you have" or "VBMania", is a simple Trojan horse that arrives in the inbox with the odd-but-suggestive subject line "here you have". The body reads "This is The Document I told you about, you can find it Here" or "This is The Free Download Sex Movies, you can find it Here".

=== 2011 ===
- SpyEye and Zeus merged code is seen. New variants attack mobile phone banking information.
- Anti-Spyware 2011, a Trojan horse that attacks Windows 9x, 2000, XP, Vista, and Windows 7, posing as an anti-spyware program. It disables security-related processes of anti-virus programs, while also blocking access to the Internet, which prevents updates.
- Summer 2011: The Morto worm attempts to propagate itself to additional computers via the Microsoft Windows Remote Desktop Protocol (RDP). Morto spreads by forcing infected systems to scan for Windows servers allowing RDP login. Once Morto finds an RDP-accessible system, it attempts to log into a domain or local system account named 'Administrator' using several common passwords. A detailed overview of how the worm works – along with the password dictionary Morto uses – was done by Imperva.
- July 13: the ZeroAccess rootkit (also known as Sirefef or max++) was discovered.
- September 1: Duqu is a worm thought to be related to the Stuxnet worm. The Laboratory of Cryptography and System Security (CrySyS Lab) of the Budapest University of Technology and Economics in Hungary discovered the threat, analysed the malware, and wrote a 60-page report naming the threat Duqu. Duqu gets its name from the prefix "~DQ" it gives to the names of files it creates.

=== 2012 ===
- May: Flame – also known as Flamer, sKyWIper, and Skywiper – a modular computer malware that attacks computers running Microsoft Windows. Used for targeted cyber espionage in Middle Eastern countries. Its discovery was announced on 28 May 2012 by MAHER Center of Iranian National Computer Emergency Response Team (CERT), Kaspersky Lab and CrySyS Lab of the Budapest University of Technology and Economics. CrySyS stated in their report that "sKyWIper is certainly the most sophisticated malware we encountered during our practice; arguably, it is the most complex malware ever found".
- August 16: Shamoon is a computer virus designed to target computers running Microsoft Windows in the energy sector. Symantec, Kaspersky Lab, and Seculert announced its discovery on August 16, 2012.
- September 20: NGRBot is a worm that uses the IRC network for file transfer, sending and receiving commands between zombie network machines and the attacker's IRC server, and monitoring and controlling network connectivity and intercept. It employs a user-mode rootkit technique to hide and steal its victim's information. This family of bot is also designed to infect HTML pages with inline frames (iframes), causing redirections, blocking victims from getting updates from security/antimalware products, and killing those services. The bot is designed to connect via a predefined IRC channel and communicate with a remote botnet.

=== 2013 ===
- September: The CryptoLocker Trojan horse is discovered. CryptoLocker encrypts the files on a user's hard drive, then prompts them to pay a ransom to the developer to receive the decryption key. In the following months, several copycat ransomware Trojans were also discovered.
- December: The Gameover ZeuS Trojan is discovered. This type of virus steals one's login details on popular Web sites that involve monetary transactions. It works by detecting a login page, then proceeds to inject malicious code into the page, keystroke logging the computer user's details.
- December: Linux.Darlloz targets the Internet of things and infects routers, security cameras, set-top boxes by exploiting a PHP vulnerability.

=== 2014 ===
- November: The Regin Trojan horse is discovered. Regin is a dropper, primarily spread via spoofed Web pages. Once installed, it quietly downloads additional malware, making it difficult for signature-based anti-virus programs to detect. It is believed to have been created by the United States and United Kingdom as a tool for espionage and mass surveillance.

=== 2015 ===
- The BASHLITE malware is leaked leading to a massive spike in DDoS attacks.
- Linux.Wifatch is revealed to the general public. It is found to attempt to secure devices from other more malicious malware.

=== 2016 ===
- January: A trojan named "MEMZ" is created. The creator, Leurak, explained that the trojan was intended merely as a joke. The trojan alerts the user to the fact that it is a trojan and warns them that if they proceed, the computer may no longer be usable. It contains complex payloads that corrupt the system, displaying artifacts on the screen as it runs. Once run, the application cannot be closed without causing further damage to the computer, which will stop functioning properly regardless. When the computer is restarted, in place of the bootsplash is a message that reads "Your computer has been trashed by the MEMZ Trojan. Now enjoy the Nyan cat...", which follows with an animation of the Nyan Cat.
- February: Ransomware Locky with its over 60 derivatives spread throughout Europe and infected several million computers. At the height of the spread over five thousand computers per hour were infected in Germany alone. Although ransomware was not a new thing at the time, insufficient cyber security as well as a lack of standards in IT was responsible for the high number of infections. Unfortunately, even up to date antivirus and internet security software was unable to protect systems from early versions of Locky.
- February: Tiny Banker Trojan (Tinba) makes headlines. Since its discovery, it has been found to have infected more than two dozen major banking institutions in the United States, including TD Bank, Chase, HSBC, Wells Fargo, PNC and Bank of America. Tiny Banker Trojan uses HTTP injection to force the user's computer to believe that it is on the bank's website. This spoof page will look and function just as the real one. The user then enters their information to log on, at which point Tinba can launch the bank webpage's "incorrect login information" return, and redirect the user to the real website. This is to trick the user into thinking they had entered the wrong information and proceed as normal, although now Tinba has captured the credentials and sent them to its host.
- August: Journalists and researchers report the discovery of spyware, called Pegasus, developed and distributed by a private company which can and has been used to infect iOS and Android smartphones often – based on 0-day exploits – without the need for any user-interaction or significant clues to the user and then be used to exfiltrate data, track user locations, capture film through its camera, and activate the microphone at any time. The investigation suggests it was used on many targets worldwide and revealed its use for e.g. governments' espionage on journalists, opposition politicians, activists, business people and others.
- September: Mirai creates headlines by launching some of the most powerful and disruptive DDoS attacks seen to date by infecting the Internet of Things. Mirai ends up being used in the DDoS attack on 20 September 2016 on the Krebs on Security site which reached 620 Gbit/s. Ars Technica also reported a 1 Tbit/s attack on French web host OVH. On 21 October 2016 multiple major DDoS attacks in DNS services of DNS service provider Dyn occurred using Mirai malware installed on a large number of IoT devices, resulting in the inaccessibility of several high-profile websites such as GitHub, Twitter, Reddit, Netflix, Airbnb and many others. The attribution of the attack to the Mirai botnet was originally reported by BackConnect Inc., a security firm.

=== 2017 ===
- May: The WannaCry ransomware attack spreads globally. Exploits revealed in the NSA hacking toolkit leak of late 2016 were used to enable the propagation of the malware. Shortly after the news of the infections broke online, UK cybersecurity researcher Marcus Hutchins, in collaboration with others, found and activated a "kill switch" hidden within the ransomware, effectively halting the initial wave of its global propagation. The next day, researchers announced that they had found new variants of the malware without the kill switch.
- June: The Petya attack spreads globally affecting Windows systems. Researchers at Symantec reveal that this ransomware uses the EternalBlue exploit, similar to the one used in the WannaCry ransomware attack.
- September: The Xafecopy Trojan attacks 47 countries, affecting only Android operating systems. Kaspersky Lab identified it as a malware from the Ubsod family, stealing money through click based WAP billing systems.
- September: A new variety of Remote Access Trojan (RAT), Kedi RAT, is distributed in a Spear Phishing Campaign. The attack targeted Citrix users. The Trojan was able to evade usual system scanners. Kedi Trojan had all the characteristics of a common Remote Access Trojan and it could communicate to its Command and Control center via Gmail using common HTML, HTTP protocols.

=== 2018 ===
- February: Thanatos, a ransomware, becomes the first ransomware program to accept ransom payment in Bitcoin Cash.

=== 2019 ===
- November: Titanium is an advanced backdoor malware, developed by the PLATINUM APT.

== 2020s ==
=== 2024 ===
- March 2: Researchers Nassi, Cohen, and Bitton developed a computer worm called Morris II, targeting generative AI email assistants to steal data and send spam, thereby breaching security protections of systems like ChatGPT and Gemini. Conducted in a test environment, these findings will highlight the security risks of multimodal large language models (LLMs) that now generate text, images, and videos. Generative AI systems, which operate on prompts, can be exploited through weaponized prompts. For instance, hidden text on a webpage could instruct an LLM to perform malicious activities, such as phishing for bank details. While generative AI worms like Morris II haven’t been observed in the public, their potential threat is a concern for the tech industry.
- March 29: XZ Utils backdoor is discovered.
- April 1: The Linux WALLSCAPE Bug is discovered.
- June 29: Brain Cipher - a variant of LockBit 3.0 Ransomware behind Indonesia's Data Center attacks.

== See also ==
- History of computer viruses
- List of security hacking incidents
- Timeline of computing 2020–present
