= Here you have =

Computer worm

Malware details
- Type: Malicious Software

Technical details
- Platform: Microsoft Windows

Here you have is a computer worm that successfully attacked tens of thousands of Windows computers in 2010 when it was sent as a link inside an email message with the text "Here you have" in the subject line. The worm arrived in email inboxes on and after September 9, 2010 with the simple subject of "Here you have". The final extension of the link was hidden by default, leading unsuspecting users to think it was a mere PDF file. Upon opening the attachment, the worm sent a copy of itself to everyone in the Windows Address Book.

== Architecture of the Worm ==
Subject: Here you have
Hello:
This is The Document I told you about,you can find it Here. http://www.sharedocuments.com/library/PDF_Document21.025542010.pdf
Please check it and reply as soon as possible.
Cheers,

The worm requires that the user clicks on the link, and then accepts several times (depending on system configuration) to run it in order to deliver the payload.

The worm propagates by sending out copies of itself to all entries in the Microsoft Outlook address book.

== See also ==
- Code Red worm
- Nimda worm
- ILOVEYOU worm
- Anna Kournikova (computer virus)
- Timeline of notable computer viruses and worms
- Pikachu Virus
