= Code Red II =

Computer worm

Malware details
- Type: Server jamming worm

Code Red II is a computer worm similar to the Code Red worm. Released two weeks after Code Red on August 4, 2001, it is similar in behavior to the original, but analysis showed it to be a new worm instead of a variant. Unlike the first, the second has no function for attack; instead it has a backdoor that allows attacks. The worm was designed to exploit a security hole in the indexing software included as part of Microsoft's Internet Information Services (IIS) web server software (CVE-2001-0500).

A typical signature of the Code Red II worm appears in a web server log as:

 GET /default.ida?XXXXXXXXXXXXXXXXXXXXXXXXXXXXXXXXXX
 XXXXXXXXXXXXXXXXXXXXXXXXXXXXXXXXXXXXXXXXXXXXXXXX
 XXXXXXXXXXXXXXXXXXXXXXXXXXXXXXXXXXXXXXXXXXXXXXXX
 XXXXXXXXXXXXXXXXXXXXXXXXXXXXXXXXXXXXXXXXXXXXXXXX
 XXXXXXXXXXXXXXXXXXXXXXXXXXXXXXXXXXXXXXXXXXXXXX
 %u9090%u6858%ucbd3%u7801%u9090%u6858%ucbd3%u7801
 %u9090%u6858%ucbd3%u7801%u9090%u9090%u8190%u00c3
 %u0003%u8b00%u531b%u53ff%u0078%u0000%u00=a HTTP/1.0

While the original worm tried to infect other computers at random, Code Red II tries to infect machines on the same subnet as the infected machine.

Microsoft had released a security patch for IIS on June 18, 2001, that fixed the security hole, however not everyone had patched their servers, including Microsoft themselves.

== See also ==
- Nimda
- Timeline of computer viruses and worms
