= Ghostball (computer virus) =

First discovered multipartite virus

- Original author: Unknown
- Initial release: October 1989
- Operating system: DOS
- Predecessor: Modified Vienna (COM file-infecting code), Ping-Pong virus (boot sector-infecting section)
- Type: Computer virus, malware, multipartite virus, file virus, boot virus

Ghostball was the first multipartite virus discovered. The virus was discovered in October 1989, by Friðrik Skúlason. The virus is capable of infecting both executable .COM-files and boot sectors.

The virus was written up based on code from two different viruses. The code that is capable of infecting COM files is stated to be inspired from a modified version of the Vienna virus. The section of the virus that is capable of infecting boot sectors is extracted from the Ping-Pong virus.

== See also ==
- Timeline of notable computer viruses and worms
- Computer virus
- Malware
- Multipartite virus
