= W32.Gammima.AG =

W32.Gammima.AG is a computer worm that was detected by NASA on computers in space aboard the International Space Station (ISS) in August 2007. The virus, a gaming virus made to steal login information for net-based computer games, did not pose any threat to the ISS.

The ISS has no direct net connection, and all data traffic travelling from the ground to the spacecraft is scanned before being transmitted. It is thought that the virus might have travelled via a flash or USB drive taken into space by an astronaut. The worm copies itself to all drives from C: through Z: as the following file: [DRIVE LETTER]:\ntdelect.com
