= Bouncing ball (disambiguation) =

A bouncing ball is a spherical object subject to physical forces, an idealized version of which is sometimes used in introductory physics education.

Bouncing ball may also refer to:

- Bouncy ball, a toy ball
- Bouncing ball (music), a visual device formerly used in musical short subjects
- Ping-Pong virus, a computer virus sometimes called Bouncing Ball
