= Sobig =

Self-replicating malware program

Malware details
- Type: Computer worm, Trojan horse
- Origin: August 2003
- Author: Ruslan Ibragimov (unconfirmed)

Technical details
- Platform: Microsoft Windows

The Sobig Worm was a computer worm that infected millions of Internet-connected Microsoft Windows computers in August 2003.

Although there were indications that tests of the worm were carried out as early as August 2002, Sobig.A was first found in the wild in January 2003. Sobig.B was released on May 18, 2003. It was first called Palyh, but was later renamed to Sobig.B after anti-virus experts discovered it was a new generation of Sobig. Sobig.C was released on May 31, and fixed the timing bug in Sobig.B. Sobig.D came a couple of weeks later, followed by Sobig.E on June 25. On August 19, Sobig.F became known and set a record in sheer volume of e-mails.

The worm was most widespread in its "Sobig.F" variant.

As of 2018, Sobig is the second fastest computer worm to have ever entered the wild, being surpassed only by Mydoom.

Sobig was not only a computer worm in the sense that it replicates by itself, but also a Trojan horse in that it masquerades as something other than malware. The Sobig.F worm would appear as an electronic mail with one of the following subjects:

- Re: Approved
- Re: Details
- Re: Re: My details
- Re: Thank you!
- Re: That movie
- Re: Wicked screensaver
- Re: Your application
- Thank you!
- Your details

It would contain the text: "See the attached file for details" or "Please see the attached file for details", as well as an attachment as one of the following names:

- application.bin
- details.bin
- document_9446.bin
- document_all.bin
- movie0045.bin
- thank_you.bin
- your_details.bin
- your_document.bin
- wicked_scr.scr

== Technical details ==
The Sobig viruses infected a host computer by way of the above-mentioned attachment. When this is started, they will replicate by using their own SMTP agent engine. E-mail addresses that will be targeted by the virus are gathered from files on the host computer. The file extensions that will be searched for e-mail addresses are:

- .dbx
- .eml
- .hlp
- .htm
- .html
- .mht
- .wab
- .txt

The Sobig.F variant was programmed to contact 20 IP addresses on UDP port 8998 on August 26, 2003 to install some program or update itself. It is unclear what this program was, but earlier versions of the virus had installed the WinGate proxy server software—a legitimate product—in a configuration allowing it to be used as a backdoor for spammers to distribute unsolicited e-mail.

The Sobig worm was written using the Microsoft Visual C++ compiler, and subsequently compressed using a data compression program called tElock.

The Sobig.F worm deactivated itself on September 10, 2003. On November 5 the same year, Microsoft announced that they will pay $250,000 for information leading to the arrest of the creator of the Sobig worm. Ruslan Ibragimov is attributed to be the original creator of the worm. However, this is not confirmed.

== See also ==
- Timeline of notable computer viruses and worms
