= Mimail =

Computer worm

Mimail is a computer worm which first emerged in August 2003; it is transmitted via e-mail. Since its initial release, nearly two dozen variants of the original Mimail worm have appeared. The Mydoom worm, which emerged in January 2004, was initially believed to be a variant of Mimail. Mimail is written in the C programming language.
