= Melissa (computer virus) =

Mass-mailing macro virus

Malware details
- Technical name: W97M.Melissa.A (Symantec); Virus:W32/Melissa (F-Secure)
- Type: Macro virus
- Author: David L. Smith

Technical details
- Platforms: Windows 95, Windows 98, Windows Me, Windows NT, Windows 2000, Windows XP

The Melissa virus was a mass-mailing macro virus released by David L. Smith of Aberdeen Township, New Jersey on March 26, 1999. Melissa spread through infected Microsoft Word documents. When a recipient opened one, the virus used Microsoft Outlook to send copies to the first 50 entries in the user's address book. The messages appeared to come from known contacts, so recipients were more likely to open the attachment.

Melissa did not ordinarily delete files, but the volume of email it generated overloaded mail servers, disrupted about one million email accounts and led some organizations to suspend email service. The Federal Bureau of Investigation (FBI) estimated that cleanup and repair costs reached $80 million and described Melissa as the fastest-spreading computer infection at the time. Smith was arrested less than a week after the virus release, pleaded guilty to state and federal computer offenses that December, and was sentenced in 2002 to 20 months in federal prison.

== Release and initial spread ==
On March 26, 1999, David L. Smith used a stolen AOL account to post an infected Microsoft Word document to the Internet newsgroup alt.sex. The accompanying message claimed that the document contained passwords for adult-content websites.

Opening the document activated the virus. On computers using Microsoft Outlook, it sent copies of itself to the first 50 entries in the user's address book. The resulting email appeared to come from someone the recipient knew. Its subject line began "Important Message From", followed by the sender's name, and its body read, "Here is that document you asked for ... don't show anyone else ;-)". The attachment was named list.doc. Each infected computer could send the virus to as many as 50 more recipients, and each newly infected computer could do the same.

== Operation ==
Melissa was a macro virus carried in a Microsoft Word document. When the attachment was opened in Word 97 or Word 2000, its macro code copied the infected document into Word's default template and lowered the program's macro-security settings. Documents subsequently opened or created in Word could then become infected.

To distribute itself by email, Melissa used Microsoft Outlook to read the first 50 entries in the user's address book and send each one a copy of the infected document. The mass-mailing function operated only on computers that used Outlook for email. Melissa did not ordinarily erase files, although sending an infected document without the user's knowledge could disclose information contained in it.

If the minute shown by the computer's clock matched the day of the month, Melissa displayed the message "Twenty-two points, plus triple-word-score, plus 50 points for using all my letters. Game's over. I'm outta here." in Word. The line came from a Scrabble scene in The Simpsons.

== Outbreak and impact ==
Melissa spread rapidly after its release. By March 29, the Computer Emergency Response Team (CERT) at Carnegie Mellon University had received reports from 250 organizations and estimated that at least 100,000 workplace computers had been affected. CERT said that the actual number was probably higher. The FBI later reported that email servers at more than 300 companies and government agencies had been overloaded and estimated that about one million email accounts were disrupted.

The large volume of messages generated by infected computers interrupted email service at several organizations. Microsoft suspended outgoing email for about five hours, and Intel reported that it had been affected. Lockheed Martin and Lucent Technologies were among the companies that closed their Internet gateways in response to the outbreak. The United States Marine Corps was also affected.

Melissa did not normally delete files, but organizations incurred substantial costs when email systems were disrupted and infected computers had to be cleaned. Its spread was largely contained within several days, although removing it from affected systems took longer. The FBI estimated the total cost of cleanup and repairs at $80 million and described Melissa as the fastest-spreading computer infection at the time.

== Investigation and prosecution ==
Microsoft Office had embedded identifying information in the infected document, including a number linked to the computer on which it was created and names associated with earlier revisions. Software developer Richard Smith found this information while examining the file. A Swedish computer science graduate student then directed him to files associated with the virus writer VicodinES. Smith found the same identifier in those files and gave his findings to the Federal Bureau of Investigation (FBI). The New Jersey State Police obtained Monmouth Internet's records of who had been connected to a specified IP address on March 26, the day Melissa was posted. Early reports linked David L. Smith to VicodinES, but New Jersey officials said that Smith did not use that name. After AOL provided a tip, state and federal investigators arrested Smith at his brother's home in Eatontown, New Jersey, on April 1, 1999.

On December 9, 1999, Smith pleaded guilty in New Jersey state court to second-degree computer-related theft and in federal court to knowingly spreading a computer virus with the intent to cause damage. He admitted creating and distributing Melissa and acknowledged that it had caused more than $80 million in damage. Smith said that he had expected any financial harm to be minor. Smith's sentencing was postponed several times. On May 1, 2002, he was sentenced to 20 months in federal prison, three years of supervised release, a $5,000 fine and 100 hours of community service. The court had calculated a sentencing range of 46 to 57 months but reduced the term after prosecutors cited Smith's cooperation in other investigations.

== See also ==
- Code Red (computer worm)
- Morris worm
- SQL Slammer
- Tuxissa
- Timeline of computer viruses and worms
- Anna Kournikova (computer virus)
