= Mylife (computer worm) =

Computer worm

The B variant picture

MyLife, discovered by MessageLabs in 2002, is a computer worm that spreads itself by sending email to the addresses found in Microsoft Outlook's contacts list. Written in Visual Basic, it displays an image of a girl holding a flower while it attempts to delete files with certain filename extensions. It is named for a phrase appearing in the subject lines of the emails it sends. A variant, MyLife.B, also called the Bill Clinton worm, instead uses a subject line "bill caricature" and displays a cartoon image of Bill Clinton playing a saxophone. Many additional variants have been reported. When the infected file is run, and the picture is closed, the worm runs its payload. MyLife checks the current date. If the minute value is higher or at 45 (For example: 11:45 to 11:59), the worm searches the C:\ directory and deletes .SYS files, .COM files and the same in D:\ Drives.
