= Sadmind =

Computer worm

Backdoor Sadmind

Malware details
- Aliases: sadmind/IIS; Worm.PoizonBox
- Type: Computer worm
- Origin: China

Technical details
- Platforms: Sun Microsystems Solaris; Microsoft IIS
- Written in: English

The Sadmind worm was a computer worm which exploited vulnerabilities in both Sun Microsystems' Solaris (Security Bulletin 00191, CVE-1999-0977) and Microsoft's Internet Information Services (MS00-078, CVE-2000-0884), for which a patch had been made available seven months earlier. It was discovered on May 8, 2001.

Specifically, the virus affected the sadmind daemon on Solaris systems which had sadmind enabled in inetd.conf, since the sadmind daemon normally ran with root privileges.

fuck USA Government
fuck PoizonBOx
contact:sysadmcn@yahoo.com.cn
Message displayed on sites altered by Sadmind worm.

The worm defaced web servers with a message against the United States government and the anti-Chinese cracking group PoizonBOx.

== Systems affected by version ==
Microsoft (IIS):

- Version 4.0
- Version 5.0

Sun Microsystems (Solaris):

- Version 2.3
- Version 2.4

== See also ==
- Timeline of computer viruses and worms
- Computer viruses
