= Disembowler =

Computer worm

Disembowler, also known as Magistr.A, was a complex email worm for Windows systems. It was discovered in March 2001. The worm targeted lawyers and other members of legal offices by searching files for law-related keywords and phrases, activating itself if found.

== Effects ==
The worm would send an email to addresses in the infected computer's Outlook address book. The email arrived with a randomly generated subject line, and 6 files. 5 of which were files from the originating PC, and the 6th was a copy of the program. After sending the email, the program would remain inactive for months, before modifying or erasing the CMOS of the computer, which is required to boot the computer.
