= Virdem =

First file virus created

Virdem was the first file virus for MS-DOS. It was written by Ralf Burger in 1986 as a demonstration program for the Chaos Computer Club conference. The virus spread by attaching itself to files with the .COM file extension. It is one of the oldest MS-DOS viruses.

In December 1986, Burger distributed the virus at the Chaos Computer Club conference in Hamburg, Germany. The virus could copy itself and attach that copy to any .COM files. Virdem was fairly harmless as it announces its presence clearly.

== Infection and symptoms ==
Virdem overwrites the host with its own code and saves the original program at the very end. It was a direct-action virus and did not spread fast. It infected only files that had a COM extension. When an infected file is run, the next uninfected program becomes infected.

When infected, small COM files, less than 11k, grow by 2559 bytes and larger files grow by 1336 bytes. Infected programs ask to guess the user a number between 0 and n such that the number matches the generation number of the virus plus one. A correct guess allows that program to run. Otherwise, it exits.

=== Technical details ===
It doesn't intercept interrupt 24h so a write-protected disk gives an "Abort, Retry, Ignore" message. Read-only files are set to read/write, infected and then not set back to read-only. The virus had two NOP instructions at the beginning of the file.
