= Jerusalem (computer virus) =

Logic bomb DOS computer virus

Malware details
- Aliases: Arab Star; Friday 13th; Israeli
- Type: Computer virus
- Classification: Unknown

Technical details
- Platform: DOS

Jerusalem is a logic bomb DOS virus first detected at Hebrew University of Jerusalem, in October 1987. On infection, the Jerusalem virus becomes memory resident (using 2kb of memory), and then infects every executable file run, except for COMMAND.COM. COM files grow by 1,813 bytes when infected by Jerusalem and are not re-infected. Executable files grow by 1,808 to 1,823 bytes each time they are infected, and are then re-infected each time the files are loaded until they are too large to load into memory. Some .EXE files are infected but do not grow because several overlays follow the genuine .EXE file in the same file. Sometimes .EXE files are incorrectly infected, causing the program to fail to run as soon as it is executed.

The virus code itself hooks into interrupt processing and other low-level DOS services. For example, code in the virus suppresses the printing of console messages if, say, the virus is not able to infect a file on a read-only device such as a floppy disk. One of the clues that a computer is infected is the mis-capitalization of the well-known message "Bad command or file name" as "Bad Command or file name".

The Jerusalem virus is unique among other viruses of the time, as it is a logic bomb, set to go off on Friday the 13th on all years but 1987 (making its first activation date 13 May 1988). Once triggered, the virus not only deletes any program run that day, but also infects .EXE files repeatedly until they grow too large for the computer. This particular feature, which was not included in all of Jerusalem's variants, is triggered 30 minutes after the system is infected, significantly slows down the infected computer, thus allowing for easier detection. Jerusalem is also known as "BlackBox" because of a black box it displays during the payload sequence. If the system is in text mode, Jerusalem creates a small black rectangle from row 5, column 5 to row 16, column 16. Thirty minutes after the virus is activated, this rectangle scrolls up two lines.

As a result of the virus hooking into the low-level timer interrupt, PC-XT systems slow down to one fifth of their normal speeds 30 minutes after the virus has installed itself, though the slowdown is less noticeable on faster machines. The virus contains code that enters a processing loop each time the processor's timer tick is activated.

Symptoms also include spontaneous disconnection of workstations from networks and creation of large printer spooling files. Disconnections occur since Jerusalem uses the 'interrupt 21h' low-level DOS functions that Novell NetWare and other networking implementations required to hook into the file system.

Jerusalem was initially very common (for a virus of the day) and spawned a large number of variants. However, since the advent of Windows, these DOS interrupts are no longer used, so Jerusalem and its variants have become obsolete.

== Aliases ==
- 1808(EXE), due to the virus's length of 1808 bytes.
- 1813(COM), due to the virus's length of 1813 bytes.
- Friday13th (Note: The name can also refer to two viruses that are unrelated to Jerusalem: Friday-13th-440/Omega and Virus-B), due to its trigger date of Friday the 13th.
- Hebrew University, as it was discovered by students who attended Hebrew University.
- Israeli
- PLO, due to a belief that it was created by the Palestine Liberation Organization to mark May 13, 1948, the day before Israel Independence Day, apparently the last day Palestine existed as a country.
- Russian
- Saturday 14
- sUMsDos, referencing a piece of the virus's code.

== Variants ==
- Get Password 1 (GP1): Discovered in 1991, this Novell NetWare-specific virus attempts to gather passwords from the NetWare DOS shell in memory upon user login, which it then broadcasts to a specific socket number on the network where a companion program can recover them. This virus does not work on Novell 2.x and newer versions.
- Suriv Viruses: Viruses that are earlier, more primitive versions of Jerusalem. The Jerusalem virus is considered to be based on Suriv-3, which is a logic bomb triggered when the date is Friday the 13th, switching off the computer on the 13th. In itself, Suriv-3 is based on its predecessors, Suriv-1 and Suriv-2, which are logic bombs triggered on April 1 (April Fools' Day), showing text reading "April 1, ha ha you have a virus!". Suriv-1 infects .COM files and Suriv-2 infects .EXE files, while Suriv-3 infects both types of files. The name of these viruses comes from spelling "virus" backwards.
- Sunday (Jeru-Sunday): It was discovered in November 1989 after a number of simultaneous reports from Seattle, Washington, United States, and surrounding areas. Several other Seattle outbreaks, including AirCop, were later traced to Asia. Sunday is a standard patched Jerusalem variant in the way it infects files. It is a type of program file virus. It infects .EXE, .COM, and .OVL files. Like the original Jerusalem, infected files occasionally become corrupted. Sunday is less easily identified than the original Jerusalem, in part because of corrected errors and in part because its payload is poorly written and fails to execute. The capitalization of "Sunday" is reported variously as "Sunday" or "SunDay", and may depend on the variant. The WildList, an organisation tracking computer viruses, listed Sunday as spreading in various forms from shortly after the list was started until 1998. Like all DOS viruses, Sunday suffered with the debut of Windows. It is now considered obsolete, although the virus was common enough that the use of previously dormant files has resulted in recent infections. However, anything other than a localised outbreak is unlikely.
  - COM and EXE files increase by size (1,636 bytes). COM files increase by a set amount, while EXE files increase by somewhere between that amount and 9 or 10 bytes less. Unlike the original Jerusalem, files will not be infected many times.
  - Interrupt 21 will be hooked.
  - Infected files will contain the string "Today is SunDay! Why do you work so hard? All work and no play make you a dull boy! Come on! Let's go out and have some fun!"
  - Because of an error in coding, the virus fails to execute its payload, intended to set off on Sundays of every year other than 1989. This is to print the previously indicated text on the screen and then delete all files run while the virus is memory resident, as the original Jerusalem did every Friday the 13th.
- Variants of Sunday
  - Sunday.a: The original Sunday virus.
  - Sunday.b: A version of Sunday which has a functional program-deleting function.
  - Sunday.1.b: An improvement upon Sunday.b which fixes a bug regarding the Critical Error Handler, which causes problems on write-protected disks.
  - Sunday.1.Tenseconds: A variant on Sunday.a which maintains a 10 second delay between messages and sets Sunday as day 0 instead of day 7.
  - Sunday.2: A variant on Sunday.a which grows files by 1,733 bytes instead of the original 1,636 bytes.
- Anarkia: Anarkia has a trigger date of Tuesday the 13th and uses the self-recognition code "Anarkia".
- PSQR (1720): PQSR infects .COM and .EXE files, but does not infect overlay files or COMMAND.COM. It causes infected .COM files to grow by 1,720 bytes and .EXE files by 1,719-1,733 bytes. It activates on Friday the 13th, and will delete any file run that day. Garbage is written to the master boot record and the nine sectors after the MBR. The virus uses "PQSR" as its self-recognition code, which is located at the end of the file.
- Frère: Frère plays Frère Jacques on Fridays. It increases the size of infected .COM files by 1,813 bytes and .EXE files by 1,808-1,822 bytes, but does not infect COMMAND.COM.
- Westwood (Jerusalem-Westwood; Jeru.Westwood.1829) Westwood causes files to grow by 1,829 bytes. If the virus is memory-resident, Westwood deletes any file run during Friday the 13th. The virus was isolated by a UCLA engineering student who discovered it in a copy of the "speed.com" program distributed with a new motherboard; it was discovered August 1990, in Westwood, Los Angeles, California. Viral infection was first indicated when an early version of Microsoft Word reported internal checksum failure and failed to run. Any file of COM, EXE, or OVL types is infected upon execution, except COMMAND.COM. The infection mechanism in Westwood is better-written than the original Jerusalem's. The original would re-infect files until they grew to ridiculous sizes. Westwood infects only once. As with most Jerusalem variants, Westwood contains a destructive payload. On every Friday the 13th, interrupt 22 will be hooked so that all programs executed on this date while the virus is memory resident will be deleted. Westwood is functionally similar to Jerusalem, but the coding is quite different in many areas. Because of this, virus removal signatures used to detect the original Jerusalem had to be modified to detect Westwood. Organizations such as Virus Bulletin used to use Westwood to test virus scanners for ability to distinguish Jerusalem variants. The WildList never reported Westwood as being in the field. However, its isolation was made after the virus had made infections in the community of Westwood. It is unknown how much Westwood spread outside California (with a few reports in neighbouring states), especially as Westwood is easily mis-diagnosed as Jerusalem. Since the advent of Windows, even successful Jerusalem variants have become increasingly uncommon. As such, Westwood is considered obsolete. Its properties include:
  - COM files executed will increase by 1,829 bytes in size; EXE and OVL files will increase by between 1,819 and 1,829 bytes.
  - Interrupts 8 and 21 will be hooked; on Friday the 13th, interrupt 22 will also be hooked.
  - Thirty minutes after the virus goes memory resident, the system will slow down, and a small black box will appear in the bottom left-hand corner of the machine, as common among most Jerusalem variants.
- Jerusalem 11-30: This virus infects .COM, .EXE, and overlay files, but not COMMAND.COM. The virus infects programs as they are used, and causes infected .COM files to grow by 2,000 bytes and .EXE files to grow by 2,000-2,014 bytes. However, unlike the original Jerusalem virus, it does not re-infect .EXE files.
- Jerusalem-Apocalypse: Developed in Italy, this virus infects programs as they are executed, and will insert the text "Apocalypse!!" in infected files. It causes infected .COM files to grow by 1,813 bytes and .EXE to grow by 1,808-1,822 bytes. It can re-infect .EXE files, and will increase the size of already infected .EXE files by 1,808 bytes.
- Jerusalem-VT1: If the virus is memory-resident, it will delete any file run on Tuesday the 1st.
- Jerusalem-T13: The virus causes .COM and .EXE files to grow by 1,812 bytes. If the virus is memory-resident, it will delete any program run on Tuesday the 13th.
- Jerusalem-Sat13: If the virus is memory-resident, it will delete any program run on Saturday the 13th.
- Jerusalem-Czech: The virus infects .COM and .EXE files, but not COMMAND.COM. It causes infected .COM files to grow by 1,735 bytes and .EXE files to grow by 1,735-1,749 bytes. It will not delete programs run on Friday the 13th. Jerusalem-Czech has a self-recognition code and a code placement that differ from the original Jerusalem, and is frequently detected as a Sunday variant.
- Jerusalem-Nemesis: This virus inserts the strings "NEMESIS.COM" and "NOKEY" in infected files.
- Jerusalem-Captain Trips: Jerusalem-Captain Trips contains the strings "Captain Trips" and "SPITFIRE". Captain Trips is the name of the apocalyptic plague described in Stephen King's novel The Stand. If the year is any year other than 1990 and the day is a Friday on or after the 15th, Jerusalem-Captain Trips creates an empty file with the same name as any program run that day. On the 16th Jerusalem-Captain Trip re-programs the video controller, and on several other dates it installs a routine in the timer tick that activates when 15 minutes pass. Jerusalem-Captain Trips has several errors.
- Jerusalem-J: The variant causes .COM files to grow by 1,237 bytes and .EXE files by about 1,232 bytes. The virus has no "Jerusalem effects", and originates from Hong Kong.
- Jerusalem-Yellow (Growing Block): Jerusalem-Yellow infects .EXE and .COM files. Infected .COM files grow by 1,363 bytes and .EXE files grow by 1,361-1,375 bytes. Jerusalem-Yellow creates a large yellow box with a shadow in the middle of the screen and the computer hangs.
- Jerusalem-Jan25: If the virus is memory-resident, it will activate on January 25 and will delete any program run that day. Additionally, it does not re-infect .EXE files.
- Skism: The virus will activate on any Friday after the 15th of the month, and causes infected .COM files to grow by 1,808 bytes and infected .EXE to grow by 1,808-1,822 bytes. Additionally, it can re-infect .EXE files.
- Carfield (Jeru-Carfield): The virus causes infected files to grow by 1,508 bytes. If the virus is memory-resident and the day is Monday, the computer will display the string "Carfield!" every 42 seconds.
- Mendoza (Jerusalem Mendoza): The virus does nothing if the year is 1980 or 1989, but for all other years a flag is set if the virus is memory resident and if the floppy disk motor count is 25. The flag will be set if a program is run from a floppy disk. If the flag is set, every program which runs is deleted. If the flag is not set and 30 minutes passes, the cursor is changed to a block. After one hour, Caps Lock, Nums Lock, and Scroll Lock are switched to "Off". Additionally, it does not re-infect .EXE files.
- Einstein: This is a small variant, only 878 bytes, and infects .EXE files.
- Moctezuma: This variant virus is 2,228 bytes and is encrypted.
- Century: This variant is a logic bomb with trigger date of January 1, 2000 that was supposed to display the message "Welcome to the 21st Century". However, no one is sure as to the legitimacy of the virus, as no one has seen it.
- Danube: The Danube virus is a unique variant of Jerusalem, as it has evolved beyond Jerusalem and only reflects very few parts of it. This virus is a multipartite virus, so it has several methods by which it can infect and spread: disk boot sectors as well as .COM and .EXE files. Because of this, how the virus works is dependent upon the origin of the virus (boot sector or program). When a contaminated program is executed, the virus resides in memory, taking 5 kB. Additionally, it will check if it also resides in the active boot sector and will place a copy of itself there if it was not present before. When a computer is booted from a contaminated boot sector/disk, the virus will place itself in memory before the operating system is even loaded. It reserves 5 kB of DOS base memory, and reserves 5 sectors on any disk it infects.
- HK: This variant of Jerusalem originates from Hong Kong, and references one of Hong Kong's technical schools in its code.
- Jerusalem-1767: This virus infects .EXE and .COM files, and will infect COMMAND.COM if it is executes. It causes .COM files to grow by 1,767 bytes and .EXE to grow by 1,767-1,799 bytes. Infected files include the strings "**INFECTED BY FRIDAY 13th**" or "COMMAND.COM".
- Jerusalem-1663: This virus infects .EXE and .COM files, including COMMAND.COM. Once memory resident, it infects programs as they are run. It causes .COM and .EXE files to grow by 1,663 bytes, but it cannot recognize infected files, so it may re-infect both .COM and .EXE files.
- Jerusalem-Haifa: This virus infects .EXE and .COM files, but not COMMAND.COM. It causes .COM files to grow by 2,178 bytes and .EXE files to grow by 1,960-1,974 bytes. Its name is due to the Hebrew word for Haifa, an Israeli city, being in the virus code.
- Phenome: This virus is similar to the Apocalypse variant, but will infect COMMAND.COM. It only activates on Saturdays, and does not allow the user to execute programs. It features the string "PHENOME.COM" and "MsDos".

== See also ==
- Timeline of computer viruses and worms
