= Graybird =

Trojan horse for the Windows platform

Malware details
- Type: Trojan horse
- Origin: 2003

Technical details
- Platform: Windows 95 to Windows Vista

Graybird is a Trojan horse that hides its presence on compromised computers and downloads files from remote Web sites. There are many variations of this virus.

It was discovered on September 3, 2003 and affects Windows 2000, Windows 95, Windows 98, Windows Me, Windows NT, Windows Server 2003, Windows XP, and Windows Vista.

Graybird is classified as a backdoor Trojan horse, which means it allows attackers to gain remote control over infected machines. The presence of the file Svch0st.exe is often an indicator of Graybird infection, as it mimics legitimate system processes to evade detection. The Trojan can be delivered through various means, such as being bundled with other malware or downloaded unknowingly by users visiting malicious websites.

One of the most notable variants of Graybird is Backdoor.Graybird.P, which is the most recently identified version of the malware. The development of Graybird has seen a decline, with reports indicating that its creators abandoned the project in March 2007 due to decreased effectiveness and the emergence of more advanced malware. Despite this, Graybird has been ranked among the top ten viruses affecting Windows systems during its peak.

To combat infections, users are advised to utilize antivirus software and tools like HijackThis, which can help identify and remove malicious files from affected systems. Regular updates and security patches for Windows operating systems are also crucial in preventing such infections.
