= Esperanto (computer virus) =

Multiplatform Computer Virus (1997)

Esperanto (formally Esperanto.4733) is a computer virus that appeared in 1997, named for the constructed language Esperanto. The program's name was derived from its cross-platform nature, with it being able to attack DOS, Windows, and Macintosh systems, being "international" in a similar way to Esperanto. The virus was the first platform-agnostic virus of its kind. The virus also pays homage to the language in that it is activated on 26 July, Esperanto Day.

== Design ==
Esperanto is capable of infecting both .COM and .exe files on PC, as well as most programs on Macintosh. Despite its platform neutrality, it appears as though it never spread organically across platforms due to recompile errors in the source code, and to cross platform barriers needed to be transferred through manual means. It ran entirely independently on each platform.

Esperanto lays unapparent when it spreads through infected files, but is activated on 26 July each year when infected programs are executed. This day is also known as Esperanto Day, the anniversary of the symbolic founding of the language. When an infected file is launched on 26 July, it will display the following bilingual text in English and Esperanto;

[Esperanto, by Mister Sandman/29A]                        
Never mind your culture / Ne gravas via kulturo,
Esperanto will go beyond it / Esperanto preterpasos ĝin;
never mind the differences / ne gravas la diferencoj,
Esperanto will overcome them / Esperanto superos ilin.
Never mind your processor / Ne gravas via procesoro,
Esperanto will work in it / Esperanto funkcios sub ĝi;
never mind your platform / Ne gravas via platformo,
Esperanto will infect it / Esperanto infektos ĝin.
Now not only a human language, but also a virus…        
Turning impossible into possible, Esperanto.              

Due to the bilingualism of the messages, some have theorized that the virus programmer behind Esperanto.4733 may have been an Esperantist, and the program was made for the purpose of the promotion of Esperanto.
