= Code Red (computer worm) =

Computer worm

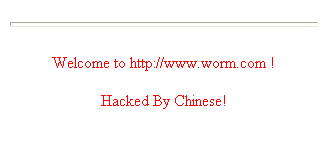
- A website defaced by the worm

Malware details
- Technical name: CRv and CRvII
- Type: Server Jamming Worm

Code Red was a computer worm observed on the Internet on July 15, 2001. It attacked computers running Microsoft's IIS web server. It was the first large-scale, mixed-threat attack to successfully target enterprise networks.

The Code Red worm was first discovered and researched by eEye Digital Security employees Marc Maiffret and Ryan Permeh when it exploited a vulnerability discovered by Riley Hassell. They named it "Code Red" because they were drinking Mountain Dew Code Red at the time of discovery.

Although the worm had been released on July 13, the largest group of infected computers was seen on July 19, 2001. On that day, the number of infected hosts reached 359,000.

The worm spread worldwide, becoming particularly prevalent in North America, Europe, and Asia (including China and India).

== Concept ==
=== Exploited vulnerability ===
The worm showed a vulnerability in software distributed with IIS, described in Microsoft Security Bulletin MS01-033 (CVE-2001-0500), for which a patch had become available a month earlier.

The worm spread itself using a common type of vulnerability known as a buffer overflow. It did this by using a long string of the repeated letter 'N' to overflow a buffer, allowing the worm to execute arbitrary code and infect the machine with the worm. Kenneth D. Eichman was the first to discover how to block it, and was invited to the White House for his discovery.

=== Worm payload ===
The payload of the worm included:

- Defacing the affected web site to display:

HELLO! Welcome to http://www.worm.com ! Hacked By Chinese!

- Other activities based on the day of the month:
  - Days 1-19: Trying to spread itself by looking for more IIS servers on the Internet.
  - Days 20–27: Launch denial of service attacks on several fixed IP addresses. The IP address of the White House web server was among these.
  - Days 28-end of month: Sleeps, no active attacks.

When scanning for vulnerable machines, the worm did not test whether the server running on a remote machine was running a vulnerable version of IIS, or even whether it was running IIS at all. Apache access logs from this time frequently had entries such as these:

GET /default.ida?NNNNNNNNNNNNNNNNNNNNNNNNNNNNNNNNNNNNNNNNNNNNNNNNNNNNNNNNNNNNNNNNNNNNNNNNNNNNNNNNNNNNNNNNNNNNNNNNNNNNNNNNNNNNNNNNNNNNNNNNNNNNNNNNNNNNNNNNNNNNNNNNNNNNNNNNNNNNNNNNNNNNNNNNNNNNNNNNNNNNNNNNNNNNNNNNNNNNNNNNNNNNNNNNNNNNNNNNNNNNNNNN%u9090%u6858%ucbd3%u7801%u9090%u6858%ucbd3%u7801%u9090%u6858%ucbd3%u7801%u9090%u9090%u8190%u00c3%u0003%u8b00%u531b%u53ff%u0078%u0000%u00=a  HTTP/1.0

The worm's payload is the string following the last 'N'. Due to a buffer overflow, a vulnerable host interpreted this string as computer instructions, propagating the worm.

== Similar worms ==
On August 4, 2001, Code Red II appeared. Although it used the same injection vector, it had a completely different payload. It pseudo-randomly chose targets on the same or different subnets as the infected machines according to a fixed probability distribution, favoring targets on its own subnet more often than not. Additionally, it used the pattern of repeating 'X' characters instead of 'N' characters to overflow the buffer. According to the U.S. Federal Computer Incident Response Center (FedCIRC), Code Red II was more dangerous than the original because it opened backdoors on infected servers, allowing remote attackers to run arbitrary commands.

eEye believed that the worm originated in Makati, Philippines, the same origin as the VBS/Loveletter (aka "ILOVEYOU") worm.

== See also ==
- Nimda worm
- Timeline of computer viruses and worms
