= Computer worm =

Self-replicating malware program

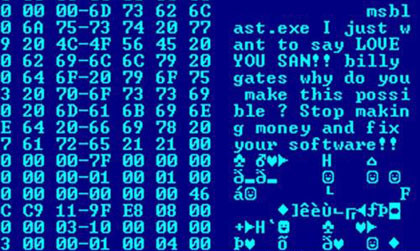
Hex dump of the Blaster worm, showing a message left for Microsoft CEO Bill Gates by the worm's creator

Spread of Conficker worm

A computer worm is a standalone malware computer program that replicates itself in order to spread to other computers. In 2026, the concept of an AI worm has been applied to AI agents as well. It often uses a computer network to spread itself, relying on security failures on the target computer to access it. It will use this machine as a host to scan and infect other computers. When these new worm-invaded computers are controlled, the worm will continue to scan and infect other computers using these computers as hosts, and this behavior will continue. Computer worms use recursive methods to copy themselves without host programs and distribute themselves based on exploiting the advantages of exponential growth, thus controlling and infecting more and more computers in a short time. Worms almost always cause at least some harm to the network, even if only by consuming bandwidth, whereas viruses almost always corrupt or modify files on a targeted computer.

Many worms are designed only to spread, and do not attempt to change the systems they pass through. However, as the Morris worm and Mydoom showed, even these "payload-free" worms can cause major disruption by increasing network traffic and other unintended effects.

== History ==
The first ever computer worm is generally accepted to be a self-replicating version of Creeper created by Ray Tomlinson and Bob Thomas at BBN in 1971 to replicate itself across the ARPANET. Tomlinson also devised the first antivirus software, named Reaper, to delete the Creeper program.

The term "worm" was first used in this sense in John Brunner's 1975 novel, The Shockwave Rider. In the novel, Nichlas Haflinger designs and sets off a data-gathering worm in an act of revenge against the powerful people who run a national electronic information web that induces mass conformity. "You have the biggest-ever worm loose in the net, and it automatically sabotages any attempt to monitor it. There's never been a worm with that tough a head or that long a tail!" "Then the answer dawned on him, and he almost laughed. Fluckner had resorted to one of the oldest tricks in the store and turned loose in the continental net a self-perpetuating tapeworm, probably headed by a denunciation group "borrowed" from a major corporation, which would shunt itself from one nexus to another every time his credit-code was punched into a keyboard. It could take days to kill a worm like that, and sometimes weeks."

Xerox PARC was studying the use of "worm" programs for distributed computing in 1979.

On November 2, 1988, Robert Tappan Morris, a Cornell University computer science graduate student, unleashed what became known as the Morris worm, disrupting many computers then on the Internet, guessed at the time to be one tenth of all those connected. During the Morris appeal process, the U.S. Court of Appeals estimated the cost of removing the worm from each installation at between $200 and $53,000; this work prompted the formation of the CERT Coordination Center and Phage mailing list. Morris himself became the first person tried and convicted under the 1986 Computer Fraud and Abuse Act.

Conficker, a computer worm discovered in 2008 that primarily targeted Microsoft Windows operating systems, is a worm that employs three different spreading strategies: local probing, neighborhood probing, and global probing. This worm was considered a hybrid epidemic and affected millions of computers. The term "hybrid epidemic" is used because of the three separate methods it employed to spread, which was discovered through code analysis.

In June 2026, it was shown that AI agents could orchestrate self-sustaining cyber-threats by entering and running from compromised computer networks or bot nets.

== Features ==
Independence

Computer viruses generally require a host program. The virus writes its own code into the host program. When the program runs, the written virus program is executed first, causing infection and damage. A worm does not need a host program, as it is an independent program or code chunk. Therefore, it is not restricted by the host program, but can run independently and actively carry out attacks.

Exploit attacks

Because a worm is not limited by the host program, worms can take advantage of various operating system vulnerabilities to carry out active attacks. For example, the "Nimda" virus exploits vulnerabilities to attack.

Complexity

Some worms are combined with web page scripts, and are hidden in HTML pages using VBScript, ActiveX and other technologies. When a user accesses a webpage containing a virus, the virus automatically resides in memory and waits to be triggered. There are also some worms that are combined with backdoor programs or Trojan horses, such as "Code Red".

Contagiousness

Worms are more infectious than computer viruses. They not only infect local computers, but also all servers and clients on the network based on the local computer. Worms can easily spread through shared folders, e-mails, malicious web pages, and servers with a large number of vulnerabilities in the network.

== Harm ==
Any code designed to do more than spread the worm is typically referred to as the "payload". Typical malicious payloads might delete files on a host system (e.g., the ExploreZip worm), encrypt files in a ransomware attack (e.g., the WannaCry worm), or exfiltrate data such as confidential documents or passwords.

Some worms may install a backdoor. This allows the computer to be remotely controlled by the worm author as a "zombie". Networks of such machines are often referred to as botnets and are very commonly used for a range of malicious purposes, including sending spam or performing DoS attacks.

Some special worms attack industrial systems in a targeted manner. Stuxnet was primarily transmitted through LANs and infected thumb-drives, as its targets were never connected to untrusted networks, like the internet. This virus can destroy the core production control computer software used by chemical, power generation and power transmission companies in various countries around the world - in Stuxnet's case, Iran, Indonesia and India were hardest hit - it was used to "issue orders" to other equipment in the factory, and to hide those commands from being detected. Stuxnet used multiple vulnerabilities and four different zero-day exploits (e.g.: ) in Windows systems and Siemens SIMATICWinCC systems to attack the embedded programmable logic controllers of industrial machines. Although these systems operate independently from the network, if the operator inserts a virus-infected drive into the system's USB interface, the virus will be able to gain control of the system without any other operational requirements or prompts.

== Countermeasures ==
Worms spread by exploiting vulnerabilities in operating systems. Vendors with security problems supply regular security updates (see "Patch Tuesday"), and if these are installed to a machine, then the majority of worms are unable to spread to it. If a vulnerability is disclosed before the security patch released by the vendor, a zero-day attack is possible.

Users need to be wary of opening unexpected emails, and should not run attached files or programs, or visit web sites that are linked to such emails. However, as with the ILOVEYOU worm, and with the increased growth and efficiency of phishing attacks, it remains possible to trick the end-user into running malicious code.

Anti-virus and anti-spyware software are helpful, but must be kept up-to-date with new pattern files at least every few days. The use of a firewall is also recommended.

Users can minimize the threat posed by worms by keeping their computers' operating system and other software up to date, avoiding opening unrecognized or unexpected emails and running firewall and antivirus software.

Mitigation techniques include:

- ACLs in routers and switches
- Packet-filters
- TCP Wrapper/ACL enabled network service daemons
- EPP/EDR software
- Nullroute

Infections can sometimes be detected by their behavior - typically scanning the Internet randomly, looking for vulnerable hosts to infect. In addition, machine learning techniques can be used to detect new worms, by analyzing the behavior of the suspected computer.

== Helpful worms ==
A helpful worm or anti-worm is a worm designed to do something that its author feels is helpful, though not necessarily with the permission of the executing computer's owner. Beginning with the first research into worms at Xerox PARC, there have been attempts to create useful worms. Those worms allowed John Shoch and Jon Hupp to test the Ethernet principles on their network of Xerox Alto computers. Similarly, the Nachi family of worms tried to download and install patches from Microsoft's website to fix vulnerabilities in the host system by exploiting those same vulnerabilities. In practice, although this may have made these systems more secure, it generated considerable network traffic, rebooted the machine in the course of patching it, and did its work without the consent of the computer's owner or user. Another example of this approach is Roku OS patching a bug allowing for Roku OS to be rooted via an update to their screensaver channels, which the screensaver would attempt to connect to the telnet and patch the device. Regardless of their payload or their writers' intentions, security experts regard all worms as malware.

One study proposed the first computer worm that operates on the second layer of the OSI model (Data link Layer), utilizing topology information such as Content-addressable memory (CAM) tables and Spanning Tree information stored in switches to propagate and probe for vulnerable nodes until the enterprise network is covered.

Anti-worms have been used to combat the effects of the Code Red, Blaster, and Santy worms. Welchia is an example of a helpful worm. Utilizing the same deficiencies exploited by the Blaster worm, Welchia infected computers and automatically began downloading Microsoft security updates for Windows without the users' consent. Welchia automatically reboots the computers it infects after installing the updates. One of these updates was the patch that fixed the exploit.

Other examples of helpful worms are "Den_Zuko", "Cheeze", "CodeGreen", and "Millenium".

Art worms support artists in the performance of massive scale ephemeral artworks. It turns the infected computers into nodes that contribute to the artwork.

== See also ==
- List of computer worms
- BlueKeep
- Botnet
- Code Shikara (Worm)
- Computer and network surveillance
- Computer virus
- Computer security
- Email spam
- Father Christmas (computer worm)
- Self-replicating machine
- Technical support scam – unsolicited phone calls from a fake "tech support" person, claiming that the computer has a virus or other problems
- Timeline of computer viruses and worms
- Trojan horse (computing)
- Worm memory test
- XSS worm
- Zombie (computer science)
