= 2004 =

2004 in various calendars
- Gregorian calendar: 2004; MMIV
- Ab urbe condita: 2757
- Armenian calendar: 1453; ԹՎ ՌՆԾԳ
- Assyrian calendar: 6754
- Baháʼí calendar: 160–161
- Balinese saka calendar: 1925–1926
- Bengali calendar: 1410–1411
- Berber calendar: 2954
- British Regnal year: 52 Eliz. 2 – 53 Eliz. 2
- Buddhist calendar: 2548
- Burmese calendar: 1366
- Byzantine calendar: 7512–7513
- Chinese calendar: 癸未年 (Water Goat); 4701 or 4494 — to — 甲申年 (Wood Monkey); 4702 or 4495
- Coptic calendar: 1720–1721
- Discordian calendar: 3170
- Ethiopian calendar: 1996–1997
- Hebrew calendar: 5764–5765
- Hindu calendars
- Vikram Samvat: 2060–2061
- Shaka Samvat: 1925–1926
- Kali Yuga: 5104–5105
- Holocene calendar: 12004
- Igbo calendar: 1004–1005
- Iranian calendar: 1382–1383
- Islamic calendar: 1424–1425
- Japanese calendar: Heisei 16 (平成１６年)
- Javanese calendar: 1936–1937
- Juche calendar: 93
- Julian calendar: Gregorian minus 13 days
- Korean calendar: 4337
- Minguo calendar: ROC 93 民國93年
- Nanakshahi calendar: 536
- Thai solar calendar: 2547
- Tibetan calendar: ཆུ་མོ་ལུག་ལོ་ (female Water-Sheep); 2130 or 1749 or 977 — to — ཤིང་ཕོ་སྤྲེ་ལོ་ (male Wood-Monkey); 2131 or 1750 or 978
- Unix time: 1072915200 – 1104537599

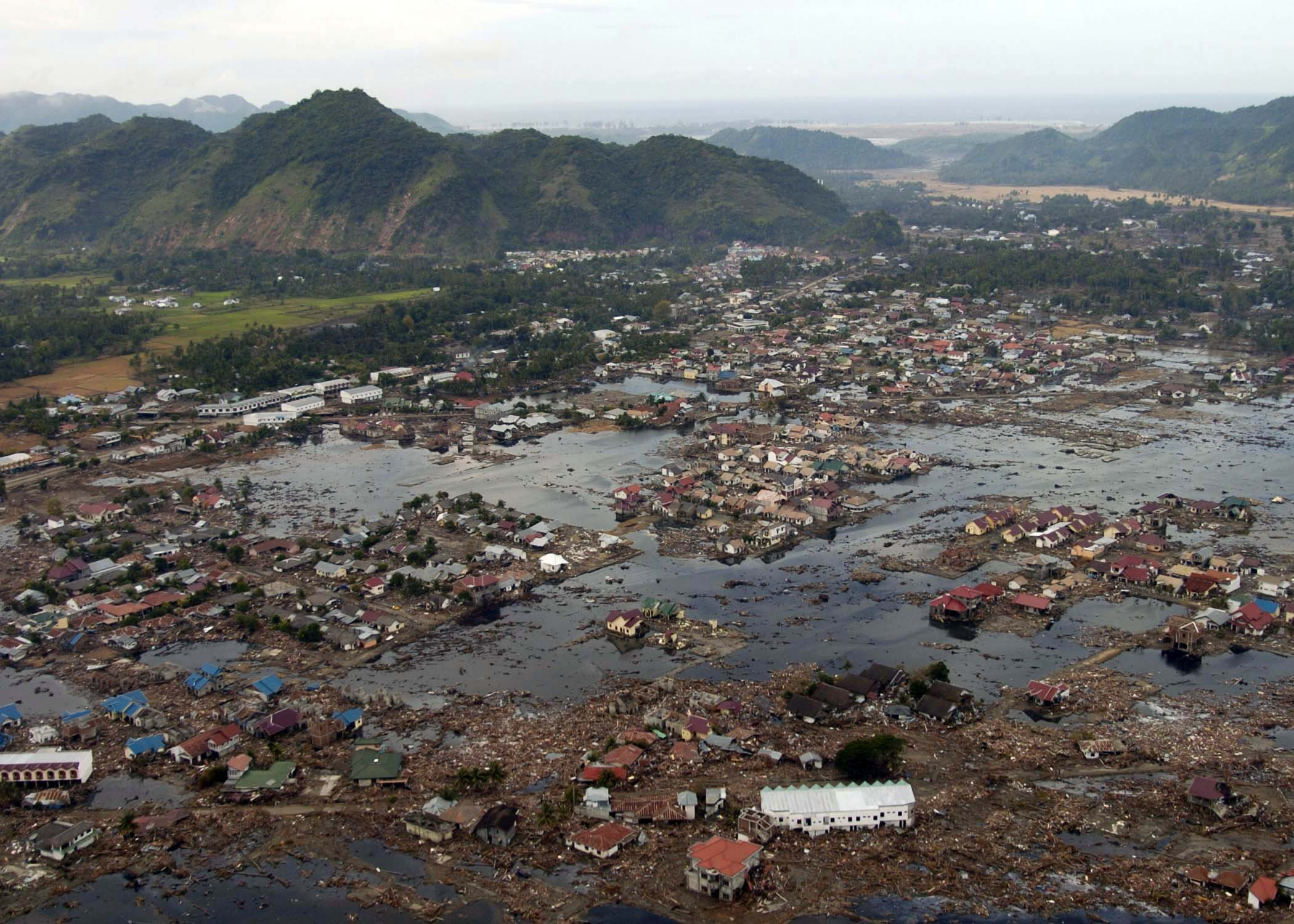
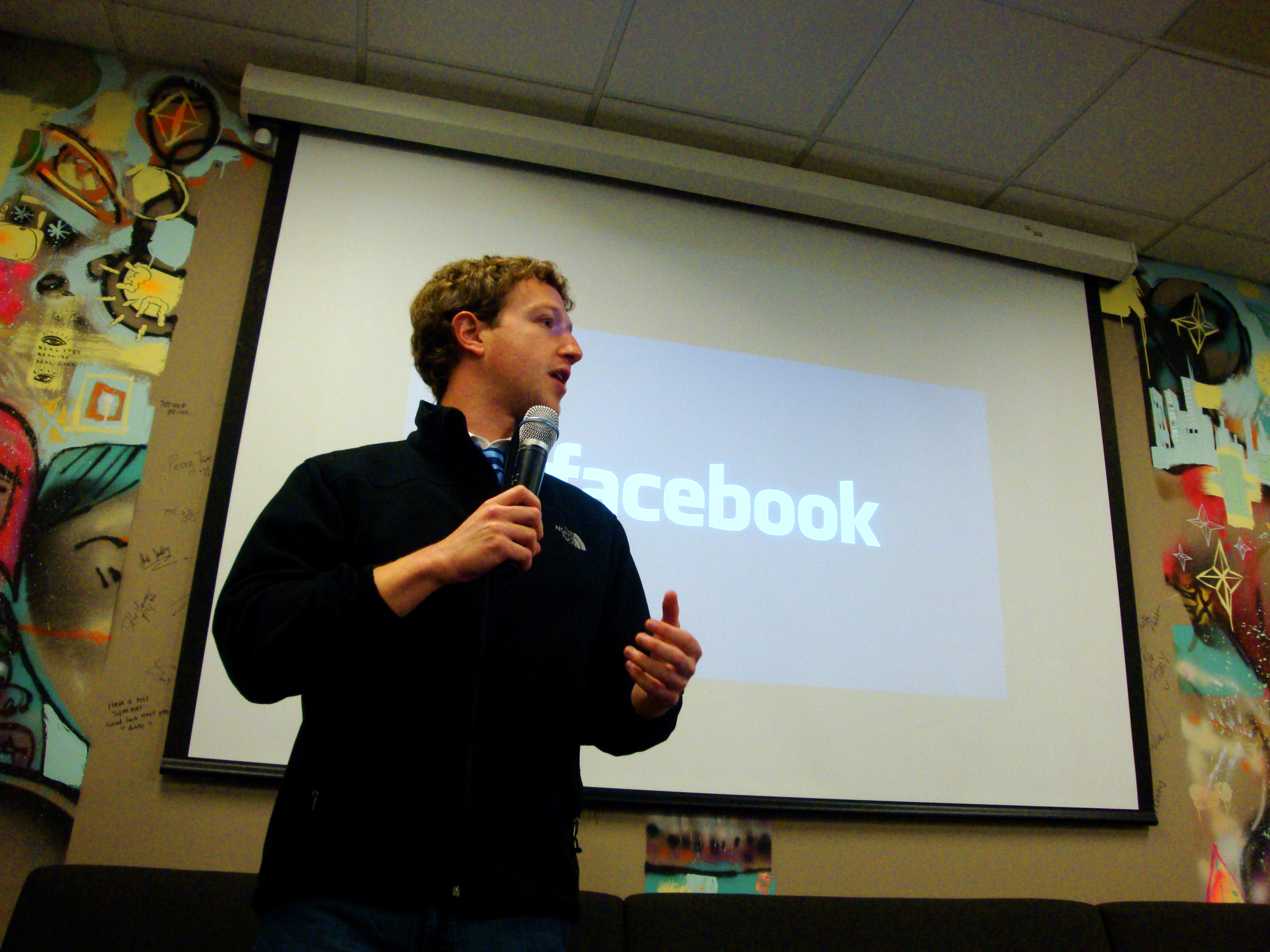
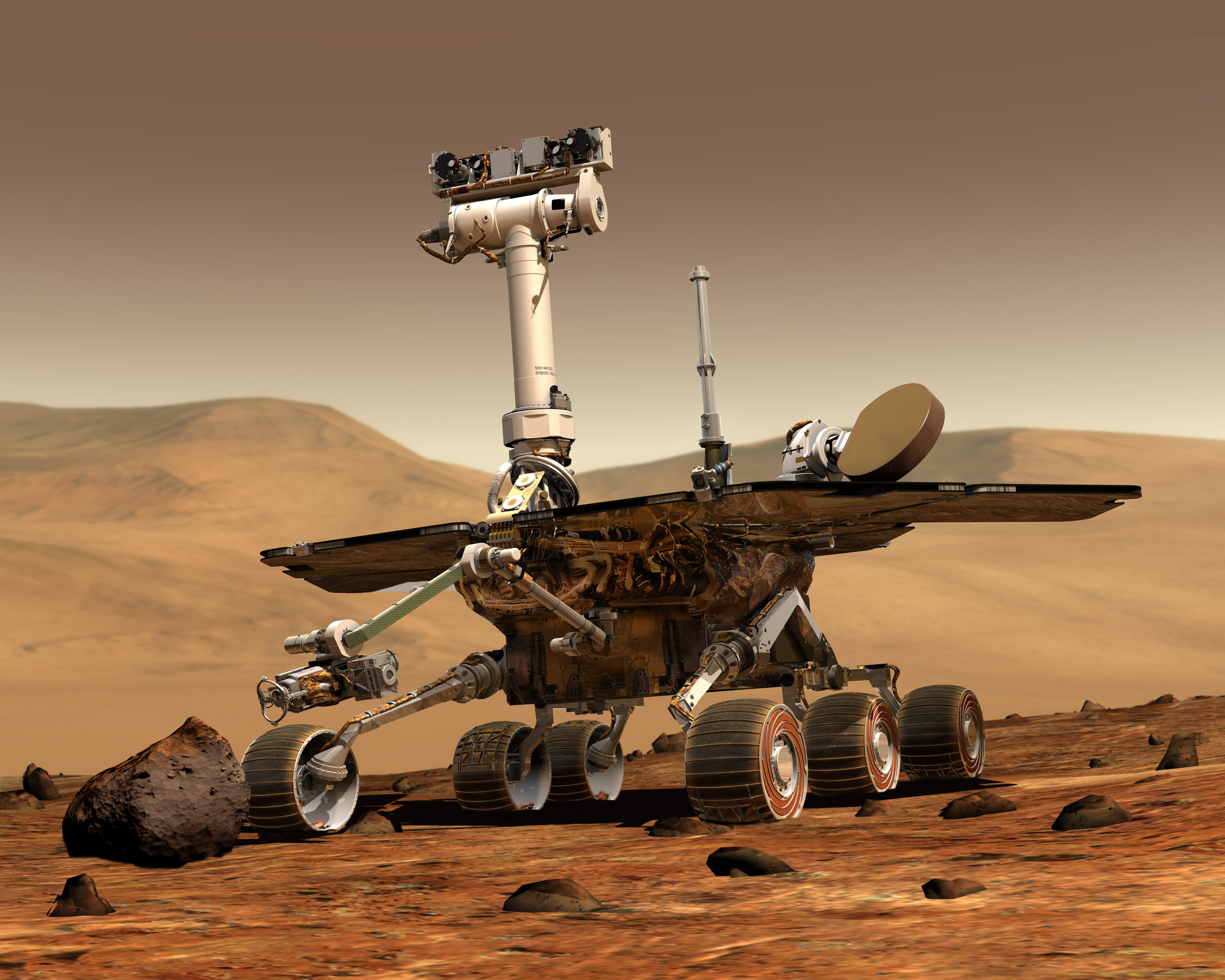
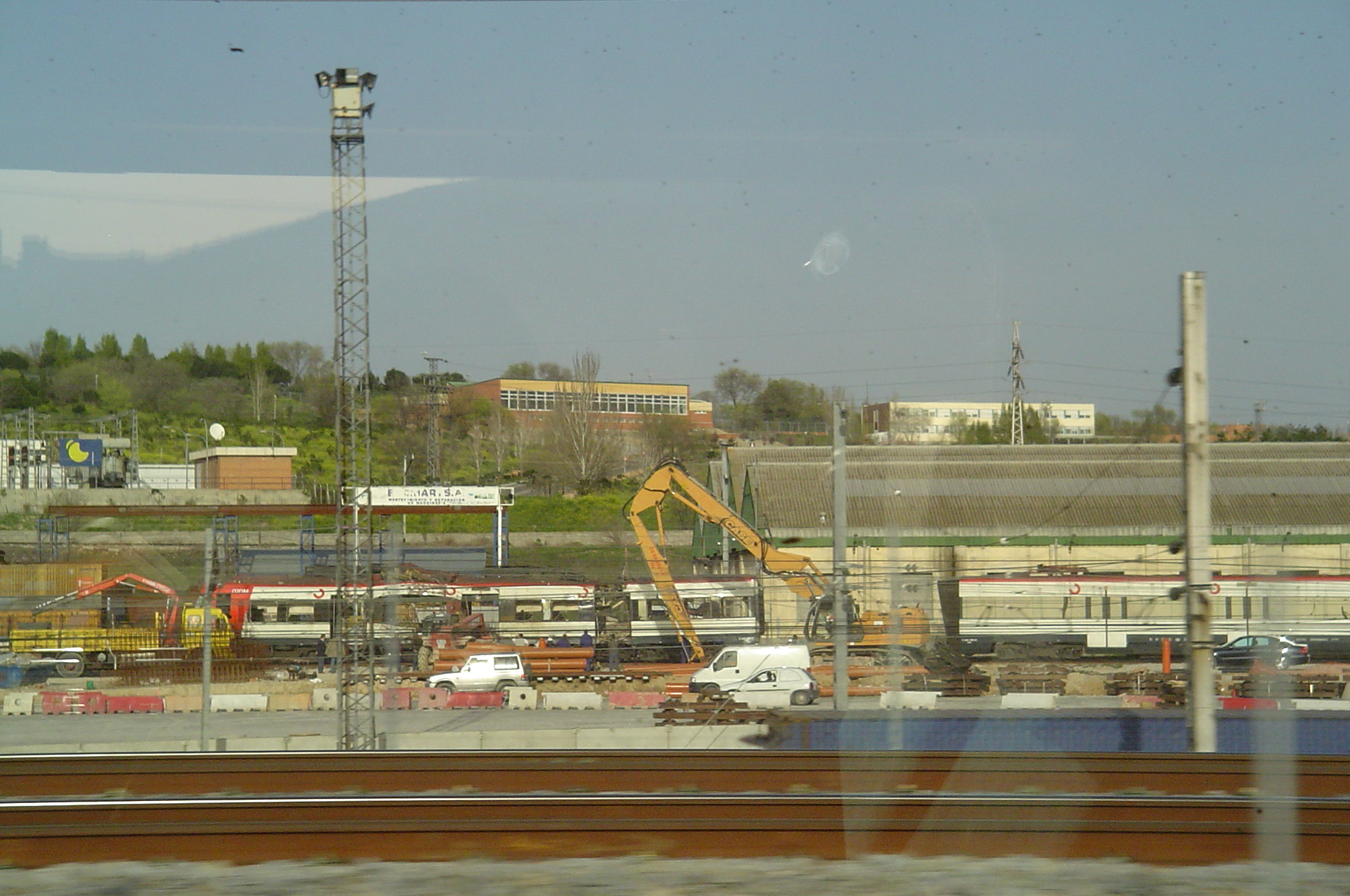
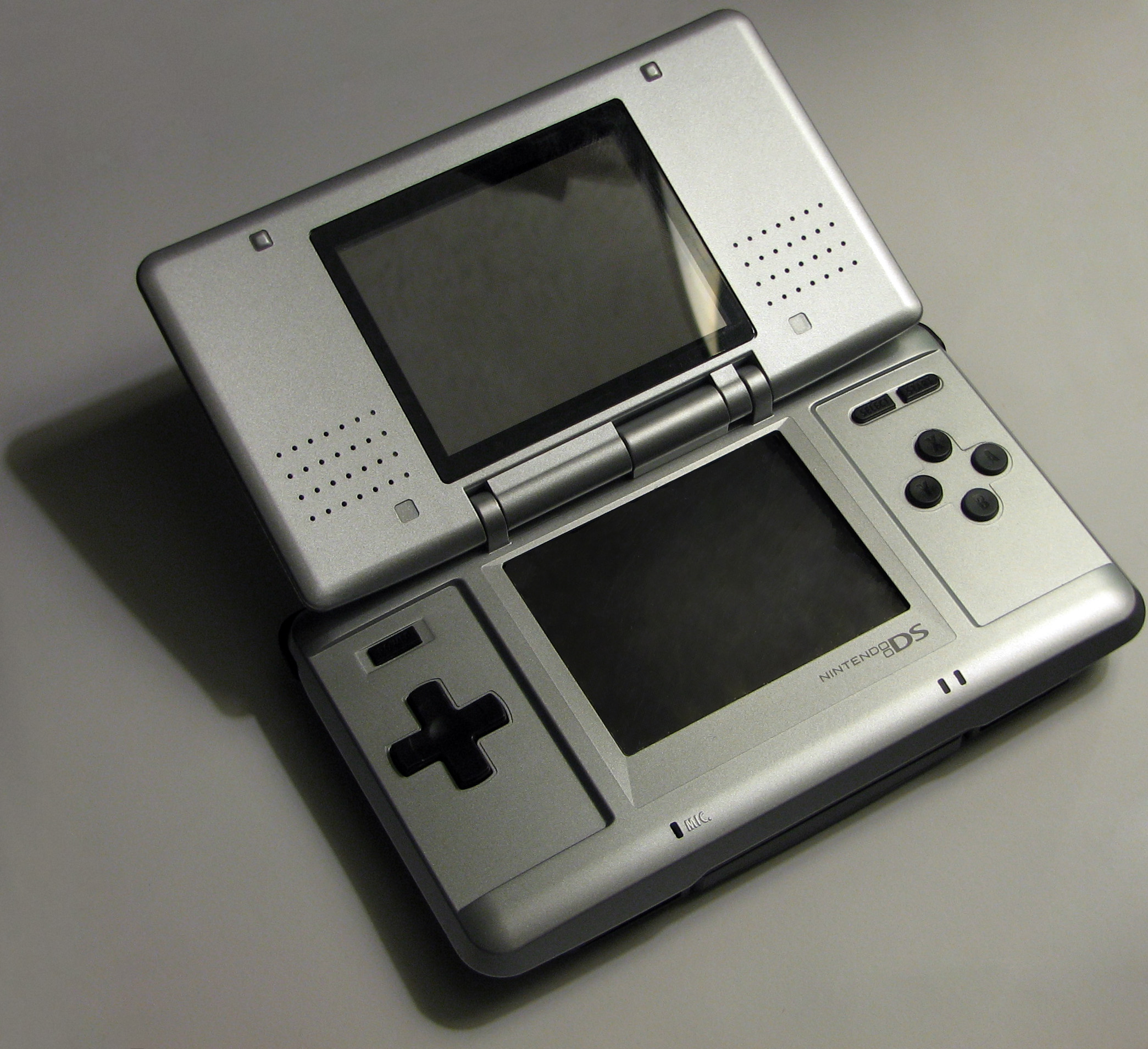
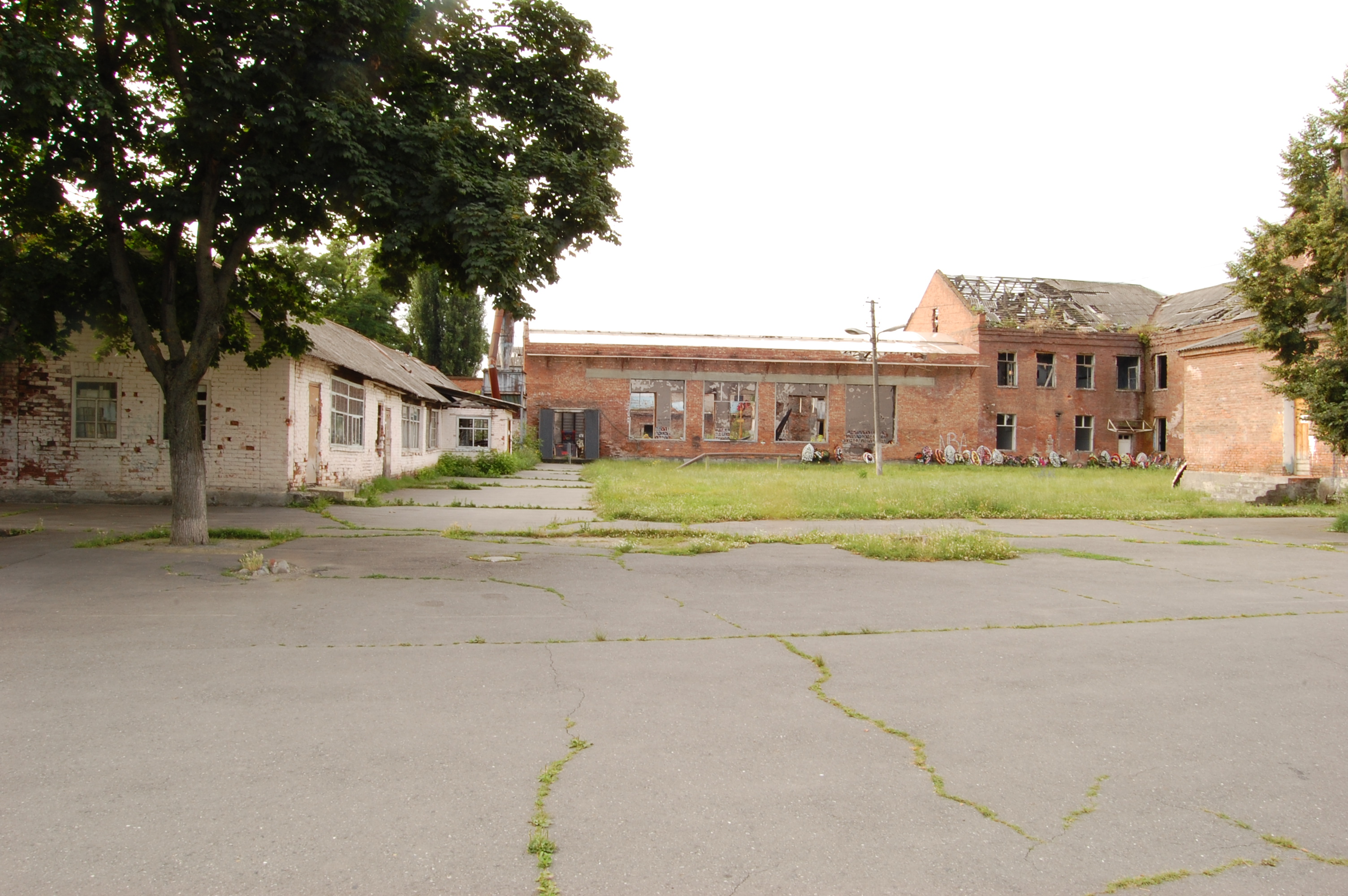
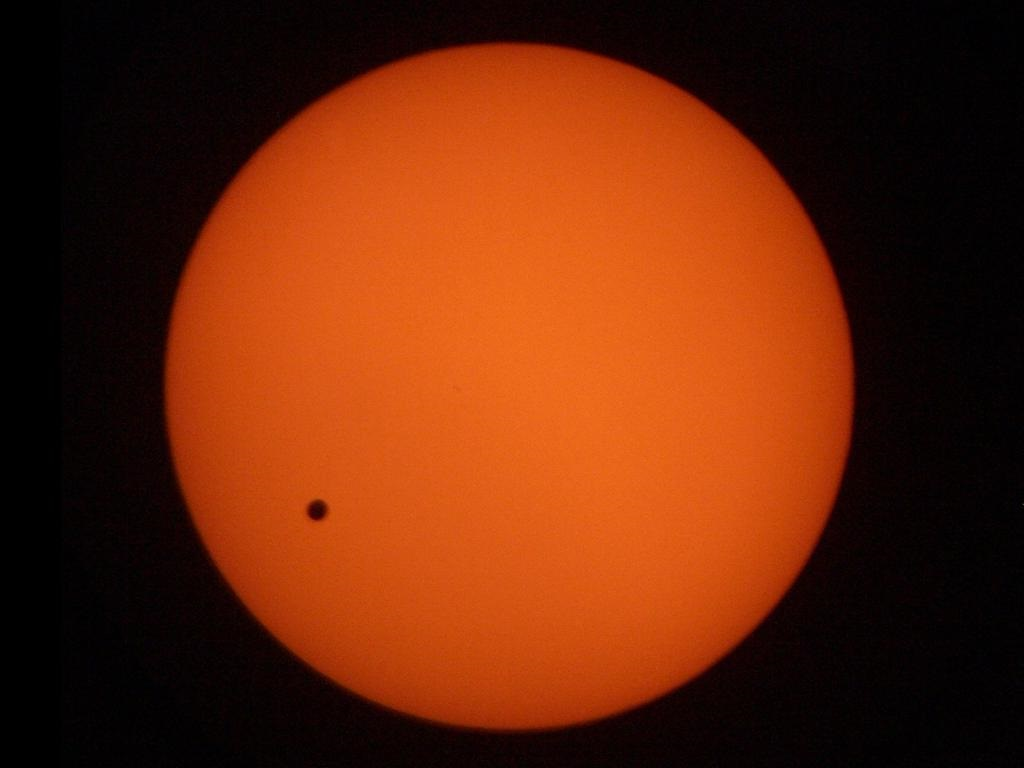
From left to right, top to bottom:
- A tsunami, caused by a massive 9.1-9.3 earthquake off the coast of Sumatra, kills over 227,000 people, making it one of the worst natural disasters in recorded history.
- Facebook, originally called TheFacebook, is launched by Mark Zuckerberg.
- NASA lands the Opportunity and Spirit rovers on Mars.
- The 2004 Summer Olympics are held in Athens.
- Multiple trains were bombed by Al-Qaeda in Madrid, killing 193 people.
- The European Union adds 10 new member-states.
- The Nintendo DS, the second best-selling handheld game console, is released.
- 334 people are killed in the Beslan school siege, carried out by Chechen insurgents.
- The 2004 transit of Venus, the first such occurrence since 1882.

2004 (MMIV) was a leap year starting on Thursday of the Gregorian calendar, the 2004th year of the Common Era (CE) and Anno Domini (AD) designations, the 4th year of the 3rd millennium and the 21st century, and the 5th year of the 2000s decade.

Global politics was focused on the American occupation of Iraq and the Iraqi insurgency. The United States transferred control to the Iraqi Interim Government, and former ruler Saddam Hussein was put on trial for crimes against humanity. American involvement became more controversial as it was shown that American soldiers were committing acts of torture against Iraqi prisoners and doubts grew about whether American claims of an Iraqi weapons of mass destruction program were accurate. Afghanistan held its first presidential election, which was won by Hamid Karzai. President Jean-Bertrand Aristide of Haiti was overthrown in a coup, and President Yasser Arafat of Palestine died in office. The International Criminal Court commenced operations and opened its first two investigations. NATO grew by seven members in 2004 and the European Union grew by ten. The nuclear weapons programs of Iran and North Korea saw renewed attention, especially after a suspected weapons test in North Korea.

The economy grew steadily in 2004, especially in the developing world, and the developed world tightened monetary policy and raised interest rates. The United States dollar depreciated throughout the year. Gay rights remained a major issue among Protestant denominations, while Islam wrestled with the violence of Islamism. The spread of H5N1 avian influenza led to fears of a pandemic, but the total number of cases remained small.

Russia's Soyuz program was the only crewed space program in 2004, but NASA's Spirit and Opportunity rovers landed on Mars in January. The debate over stem cell usage remained a major controversy in science. A new prehistoric human species, Homo floresiensis, was discovered in 2004. The year's most destructive tropical storms included Hurricane Jeanne, Typhoon Rananim, Typhoon Muifa and Typhoon Nanmadol. The final days of 2004 were defined by a magnitude 9.1 earthquake that struck Indonesia and affected countries across the Indian Ocean, killing approximately 230,000 people.

The 2004 Summer Olympics were held in their birthplace of Athens, Greece, where the United States won the most gold medals. Shrek 2 was the highest grossing film of the year and Confessions by Usher was the best-selling album. Pablo Picasso's Garçon à la pipe sold for approximately $100 million, and the world's largest architectural design competition was held to design the National September 11 Memorial & Museum. Tech releases in 2004 included the Nintendo DS handheld game console by Nintendo and the Firefox browser by Mozilla.

== Population ==
The world population on January 1, 2004, was estimated to be 6.462 billion people and increased to 6.545 billion people by January 1, 2005. An estimated 136.6 million births and 53.2 million deaths took place in 2004. The average global life expectancy was 67.7 years, an increase of 0.3 years from 2003. The estimated number of global refugees decreased from 9.59 million to 9.24 million by the end of the year. Afghanistan was the largest source of refugees, with approximately 2.1 million people.

== Conflicts ==
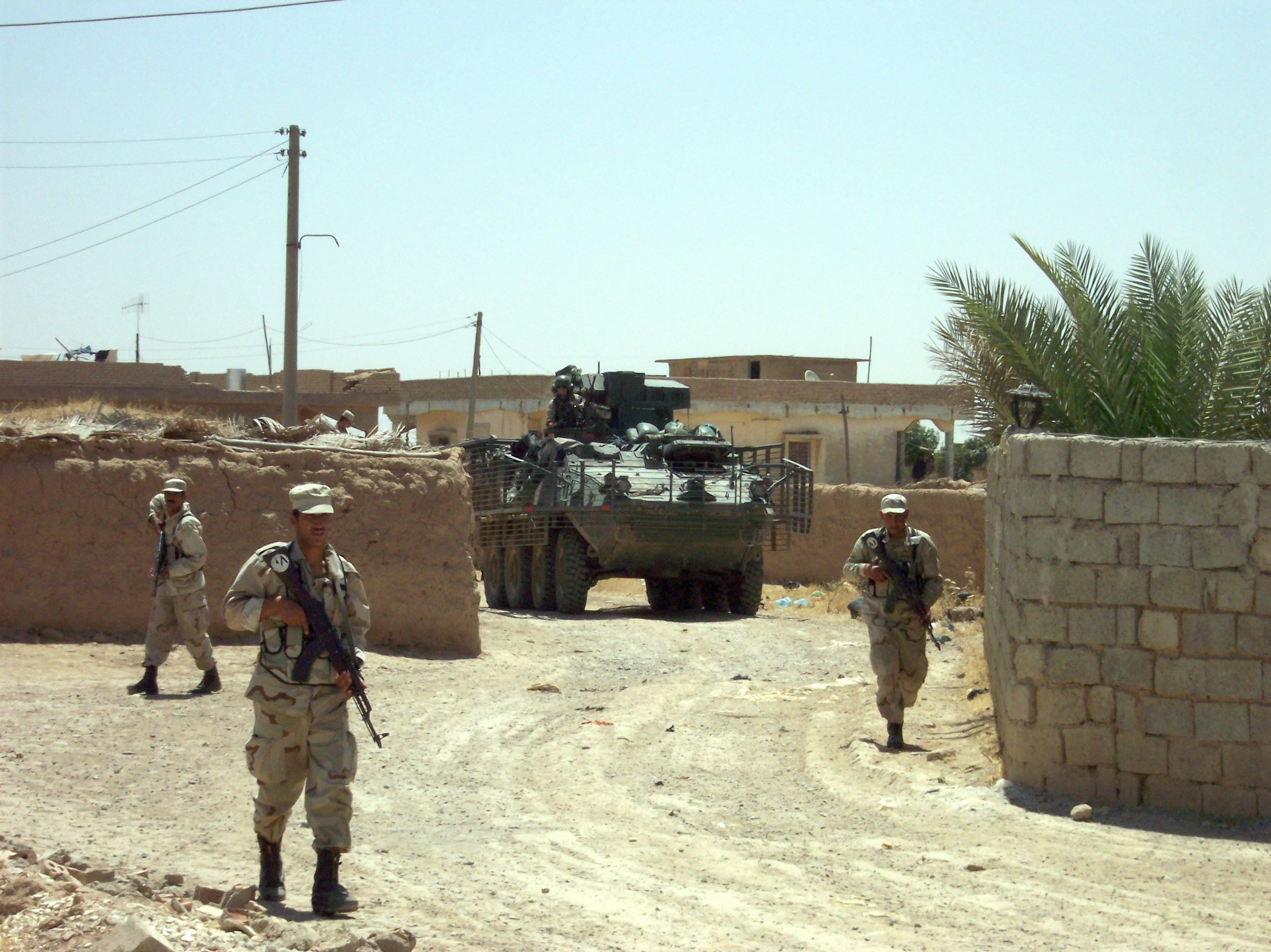
The US Army and the Iraqi National Guard

There were 32 armed conflicts in 2004 that resulted in at least 25 fatalities, all of which involved violent non-state actors. Seven of these resulted in at least 1,000 fatalities: the Colombian conflict, the Iraqi insurgency, the Kashmir insurgency, the Nepalese Civil War, the Second Chechen War in Russia, the Second Sudanese Civil War, the Sudanese War in Darfur, and the Lord's Resistance Army insurgency in Uganda.

The Iraqi insurgency emerged in Iraq in 2004 and carried out attacks against the US-backed caretaker government. It was initially confined to the Sunni Triangle but expanded to other areas throughout the year with two suicide bombings in Iraqi Kurdistan on February 1 and a conflict with the Shia Mahdi Army in April. More intense fighting took place in the city of Fallujah toward the end of the year, resulting in the deaths of 51 Americans and about 1,200 insurgents. Several countries withdrew from Iraq as the war became increasingly unpopular. Conflicts with al-Qaeda continued in 2004, primarily in Pakistan along the Afghanistan–Pakistan border. A group affiliated with al-Qaeda carried out a series of train bombings in Madrid, killing approximately 200 people in March.

The Second Chechen War continued in 2004 with a bombing that killed Russian-backed Chechen president Akhmad Kadyrov, two airliner bombings that killed 89, and the capture of a school in Beslan, Russia, by Chechen militants that resulted in over 300 fatalities in September. The frozen conflict between Georgia and the breakaway state of South Ossetia escalated in July and August until a ceasefire was signed on August 18.

Two major rebel groups acted for the first time in 2004: the National Revolutionary Front for the Liberation and Reconstruction of Haiti successfully brought about the resignation of President Jean-Bertrand Aristide, while the Islamic Jihad Union was defeated in its attempt to overthrow the government of Uzbekistan. The Haitian conflict led to the MINUSTAH UN peacekeeping mission.

Other major conflicts in 2004 included ethnic conflict in Kosovo that led to 19 fatalities, an ongoing Indonesian offensive against rebels in Aceh, an Islamist insurgency in Thailand that led to martial law in the southern region, an Islamic militant uprising in northern Nigeria. The Burundian Civil War was complicated as factionalism divided the CNDD-FDD and tentative peace agreements with the government were opposed by the National Forces of Liberation. The Nepalese Civil War escalated as the Communist Party of Nepal (Maoist) abducted over one thousand people to train as fighters and the Nepalese government established civilian militias. Conflict between Israel and Palestine remained heightened in 2004, including the targeted killings of Hamas leaders Ahmed Yassin and Abdel Aziz al-Rantisi by Israel, the bombing of Israeli tourists by Palestinian militants in October, and Israeli attacks on Gaza. The European Union launched EUFOR, its largest peacekeeping mission, in Bosnia and Herzegovina. The War in Darfur escalated significantly in Sudan with debate over whether its mass killings constituted a genocide.

Major peace agreements were reached in two conflicts in 2004: the conflict between Senegal and the Movement of Democratic Forces of Casamance, and the partial one between Sudan and the Sudan People's Liberation Movement. A ceasefire was established with the Lord's Resistance Army in Uganda, while a ceasefire in the First Ivorian Civil War broke down and attacks were launched against French peacekeeping forces. A 2003 ceasefire held in the Kashmir conflict, bringing about the conflict's first full year without military action in roughly a decade, although an insurgency continued in the region. Although the Second Congo War had ended, insurgencies continued within the Democratic Republic of the Congo in Ituri and in Kivu. Disarmament of the United Self-Defense Forces of Colombia began in November during the Colombian conflict, but fighting with the Revolutionary Armed Forces of Colombia continued and the Colombian government launched its Plan Patriota mobilization program.

== Culture ==
=== Architecture ===
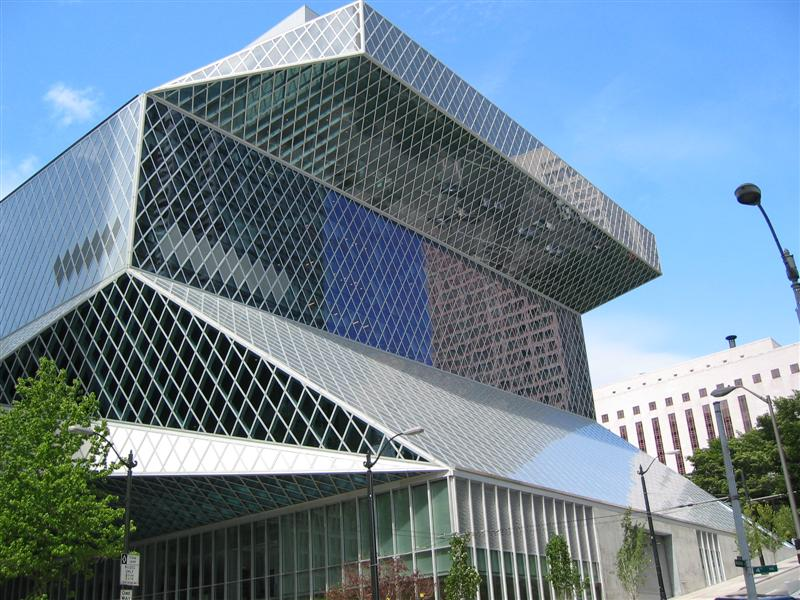
The Seattle Central Library opened in 2004.

The world's largest architectural design competition was held to design the National September 11 Memorial & Museum with over 5,000 entries. The German Duchess Anna Amalia Library was destroyed in a fire that consumed approximately 30,000 books. Reconstruction finished on the exterior of the Frauenkirche church in Dresden, which had been destroyed in World War II. After three years at a temporary location, the Museum of Modern Art relocated to a new building designed by Yoshio Taniguchi. The Pritzker Architecture Prize was won by a woman, Zaha Hadid, for the first time.

Buildings that finished construction or opened in 2004 included the Gherkin and the Scottish Parliament Building in the United Kingdom, the Sanctuary of Saint Pio of Pietrelcina in Italy, the Sharp Centre for Design in Canada, the Forum Building in Spain, and the Seattle Central Library in the United States. The Guangzhou Baiyun International Airport opened in China along with terminals in the Toronto Pearson International Airport in Canada and Ben Gurion Airport in Israel. The Rio–Antirrio Bridge was completed in Greece, as was the Millau Viaduct in France. Among new rail stations were the Blue Line in Thailand, the Hiawatha Light Rail and the Las Vegas Monorail in the United States, the Yellow Line in India, and the Shenzhen Metro in China. The Södra länken motorway in Sweden and the final stage of the Trans-Siberian Railway in Russia were also completed.

=== Art ===
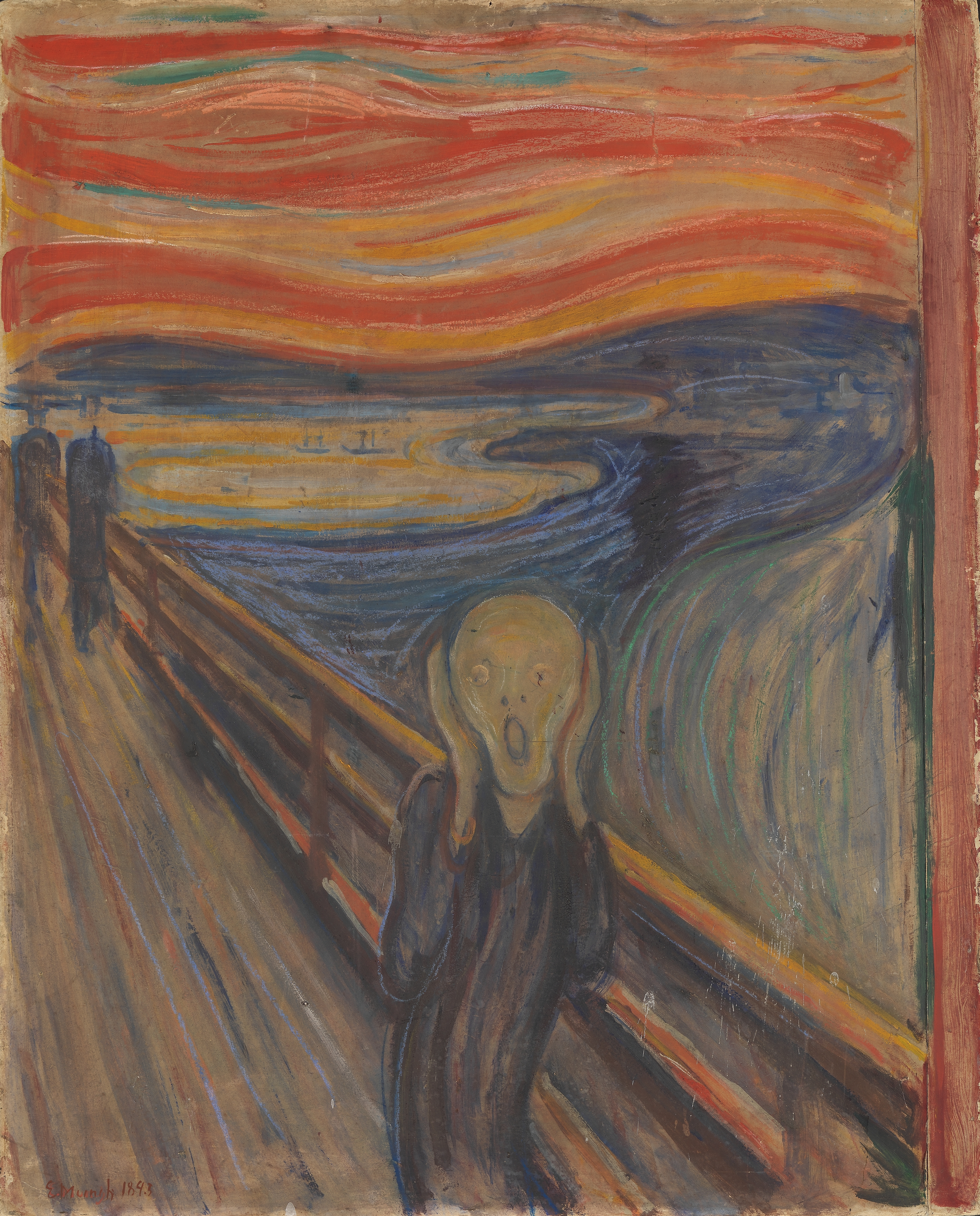
One of Edvard Munch's The Scream paintings was stolen in 2004.

Major art trends in 2004 included minimalism, Gothic art and grotesque art, the latter two making up what art critic Jerry Saltz called the "Modern Gothic". Paper drawings also saw popularity. In photography, there was nostalgia for works from the 1970s. Art speculation resurged in 2004 as the economy recovered from a recession. Major sales included Garçon à la pipe (1905) by Pablo Picasso for approximately $100 million, the Maurizio Cattelan sculptures La Nona Ora (1999) and The Ballad of Trotsky (1996) for $3 million and $2 million, and Richard Prince's photo Spiritual America for $1 million. Western fashion trends shifted from luxury designs to practical ones in 2004, and American-made jeans grew in popularity.

The biggest art exhibitions of 2004 were Treasures of a Sacred Mountain at the Tokyo National Museum and El Greco at the Metropolitan Museum of Art. Elsewhere, the Friedrich Christian Flick Collection was put on display in Berlin, the Smithsonian Institution opened its National Museum of the American Indian on the National Mall in Washington, D.C., and Prince Hans-Adam II of Liechtenstein opened a museum in Vienna to display the royal family's art collection.

The Scream and Madonna were stolen from the Munch Museum in Oslo in 2004, while efforts continued throughout the year to recover and preserve works from the Iraq Museum in response to the looting that took place amid the invasion of Iraq. About 300 artworks with a total value of $106 million were destroyed by a fire at a Momart warehouse in London, about one third of which were from the collection of Charles Saatchi, including the sculptures Everyone I Have Ever Slept With 1963–1995 by Tracey Emin and Hell by Jake and Dinos Chapman.

Photographs of subjects related to the Iraq War, including act of torture by the American military and coffins of American soldiers being stored in a cargo plane, caused public outrage. Art critic Susan Sontag cited this as evidence that photography had moved from an art of preservation to one of disseminating ideas and shaping public opinion.

=== Media ===
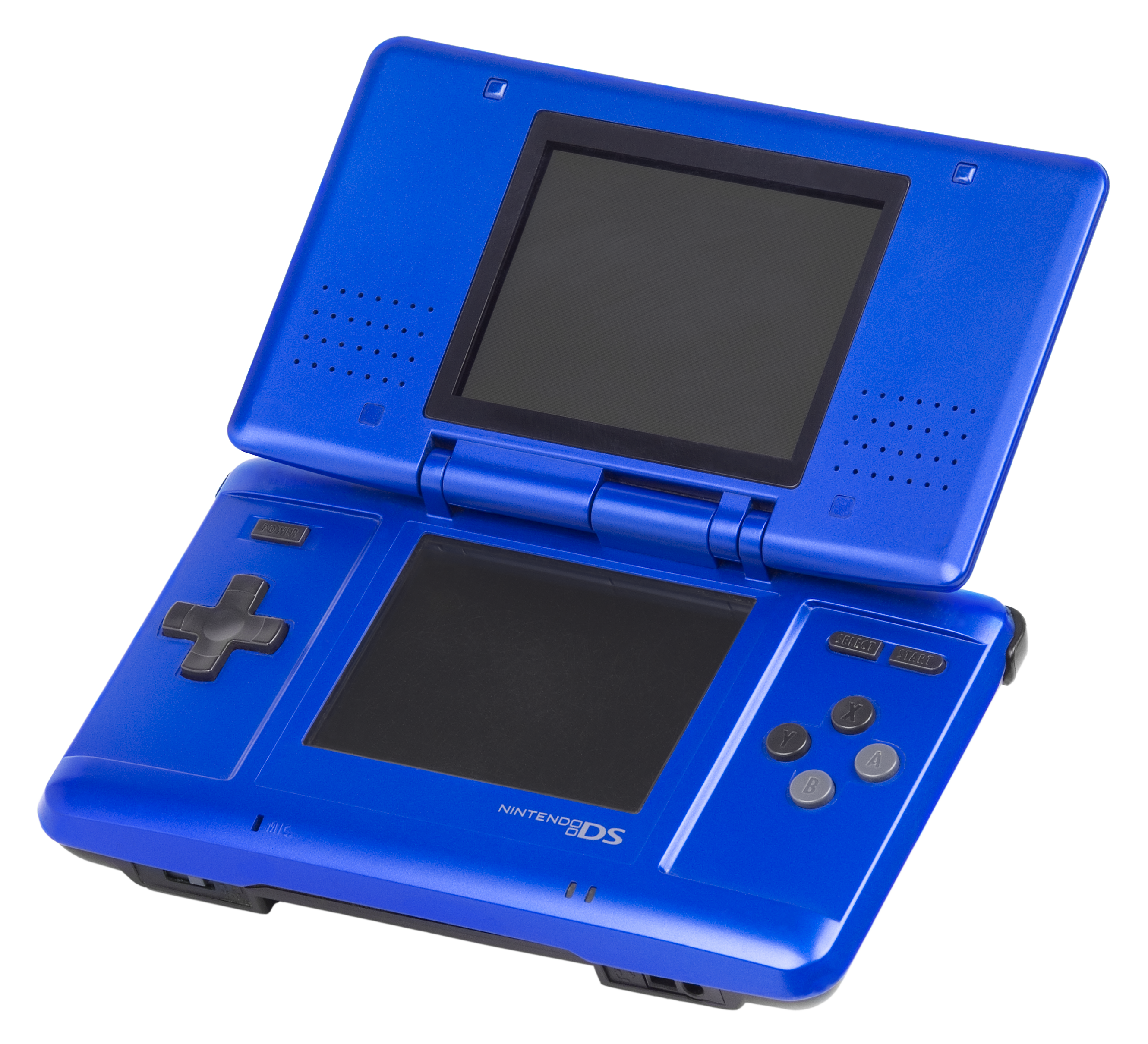
The Nintendo DS was released in 2004.

The highest-grossing film globally in 2004 was Shrek 2, followed by Harry Potter and the Prisoner of Azkaban and Spider-Man 2. The highest-grossing non-English film was The Passion of the Christ, the fifth highest-grossing film of the year. Critically acclaimed films from 2004 include Eternal Sunshine of the Spotless Mind, Kill Bill: Volume 2, and Million Dollar Baby Documentaries had a successful year in 2004 with releases like Fahrenheit 9/11 by Michael Moore and Super Size Me by Morgan Spurlock.

Music sales in 2004 amounted to about 2.75 billion physical units, stalling the decline of units in previous years. CD albums made up 86% of sales, but DVD and digital music continued an upward trajectory. The best-selling album globally in 2004 was Confessions by Usher, followed by Feels like Home by Norah Jones and Encore by Eminem. The best-selling non-English album was the Japanese album Utada Hikaru Single Collection Vol. 1 by Hikaru Utada, the 19th best-selling of the year. Several pieces of classical music were performed for the first time in decades or centuries after rediscovery, including the medieval song "Fortuna desperata", the 1940 organ performance Voluntary on Tallis's Lamentations, the 1910s opera Marie Victoire, and the 1823 opera The Uncle From Boston. Courts in Canada and the United States issued rulings that affirmed the legality of peer-to-peer file sharing despite its frequent use for copyright infringement. Apple with its iPod and iTunes service was the predominant source of legally downloaded music.

The Da Vinci Code (2003) by Dan Brown was the best selling fiction book of 2004. Several libraries lost preserved texts following attacks, including the Bhandarkar Oriental Research Institute in India and the Islamia Higher Secondary School in Pakistan. The American soap opera Desperate Housewives was a surprise hit and renewed interest in scripted television. Plays that premiered in 2004 included Stuff Happens by David Hare and The History Boys by Alan Bennett. The global magazine industry strengthened in 2004 after three years of middling growth, though the World Press Review ended its print publication after a thirty-year run. The March edition of the Russian-language Cosmopolitan reached over 600,000 sales in Europe, making it the continent's most widely circulated magazine.

Nintendo released the Nintendo DS in 2004, a successor to its handheld game console, the Game Boy. Critically acclaimed video games from 2004 include Grand Theft Auto: San Andreas, Half-Life 2, and Halo 2. Doom 3 was among the most anticipated games of the year but proved critically unsuccessful.

=== Sports ===
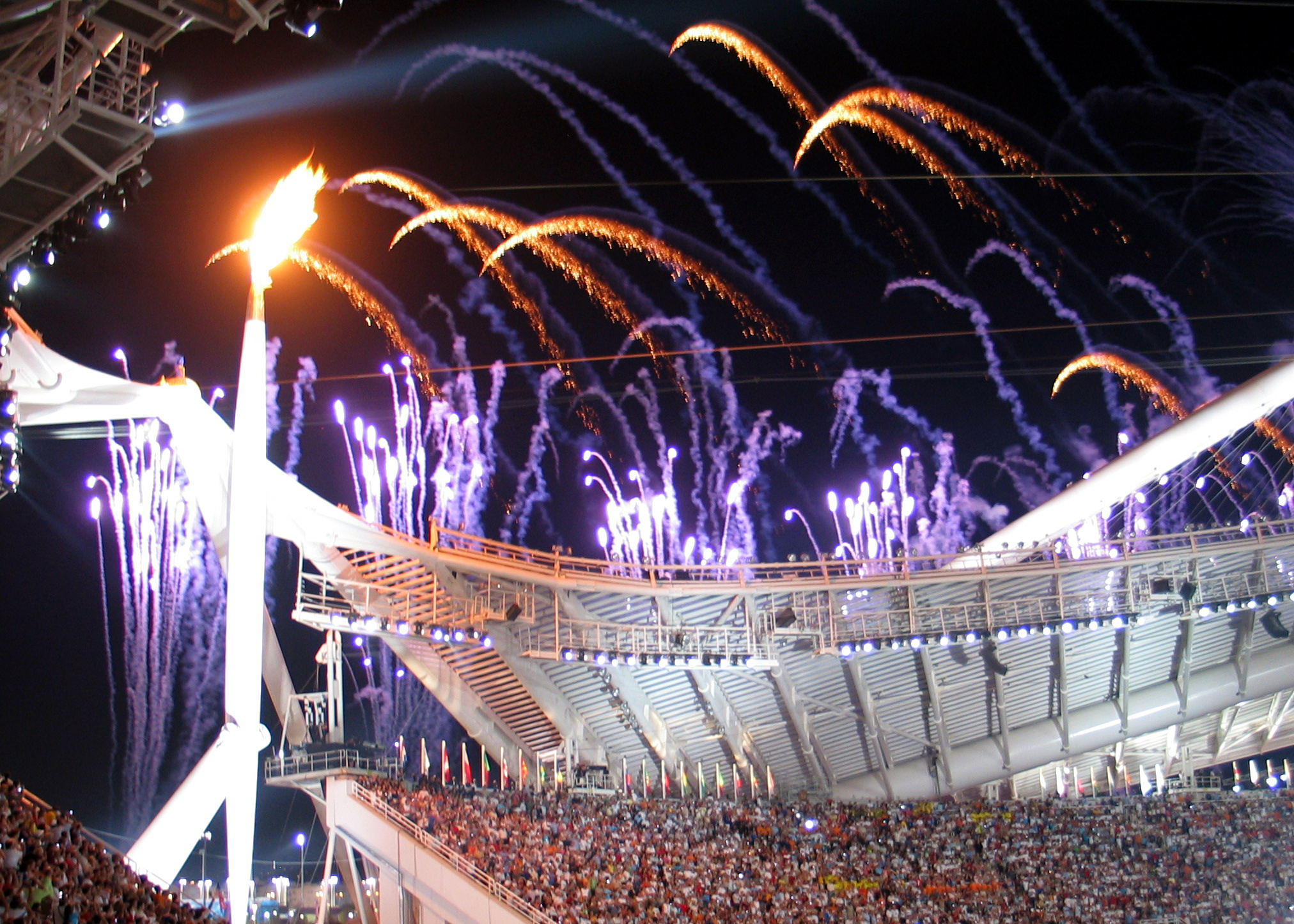
The 2004 Summer Olympics were held in Athens, Greece.

The 2004 Summer Olympics were held in their birthplace of Athens. The United States had the most gold medals with 35, followed by China's 32 and Russia's 27. Irina Korzhanenko of Russia had her gold medal revoked after failing a drug test.

Vitali Klitschko became the boxing world heavyweight champion in 2004 following the retirement of Lennox Lewis. Maria Sharapova defeated champion player Serena Williams in the Women's Wimbledon Championships, becoming the first Russian to win a Wimbledon tournament. Roger Federer won three of the four major tennis tournaments in men's tennis. Fijian golfer Vijay Singh became the world's highest-earning golfer, winning $10 million in 2004, and he unseated Tiger Woods as the top PGA Tour player in September after winning nine tournaments throughout the year. Michael Schumacher won his seventh victory with the 2004 Formula One World Championship, and Ronnie O'Sullivan won the 2004 World Snooker Championship in what was his second victory. Best Mate became the fourth horse to win three Cheltenham Gold Cups.

In Major League Baseball, the Boston Red Sox ended its 86-year losing streak by defeating the St. Louis Cardinals in the 2004 World Series. Japanese player Ichiro Suzuki of the Seattle Mariners broke the 84-year record of 257 hits in one season set by George Sisler. In association football, Arsenal F.C. won the 2003–04 FA Premier League season without losing a single game, Greece won an upset victory over Portugal in the UEFA Euro 2004, and FC Porto defeated AS Monaco FC in the 2004 UEFA Champions League final. The Tampa Bay Lightning won the 2004 Stanley Cup Final in the National Hockey League, and the 2004–05 NHL season was canceled following an industry lockout.

Steve Fossett and his crew beat the record for fastest circumnavigation by sailing, making the trip in 58 days, while Francis Joyon broke the solo record with 73 days. Pete Cabrinha surfed on a 70 ft (21 m) wave in January, breaking the record for the tallest wave ever surfed.

Scandal occurred following the half-time show of Super Bowl XXXVIII where singer Janet Jackson had most of her breast exposed, and the rest of the year was marked by strict regulatory scrutiny of potential indecency on American television. The BALCO scandal occurred in the United States after an investigation determined that the Bay Area Laboratory Co-operative was distributing performance-enhancing substances to athletes. Online fantasy sports became more widely available when AOL launched a free fantasy sports service.

== Economy ==
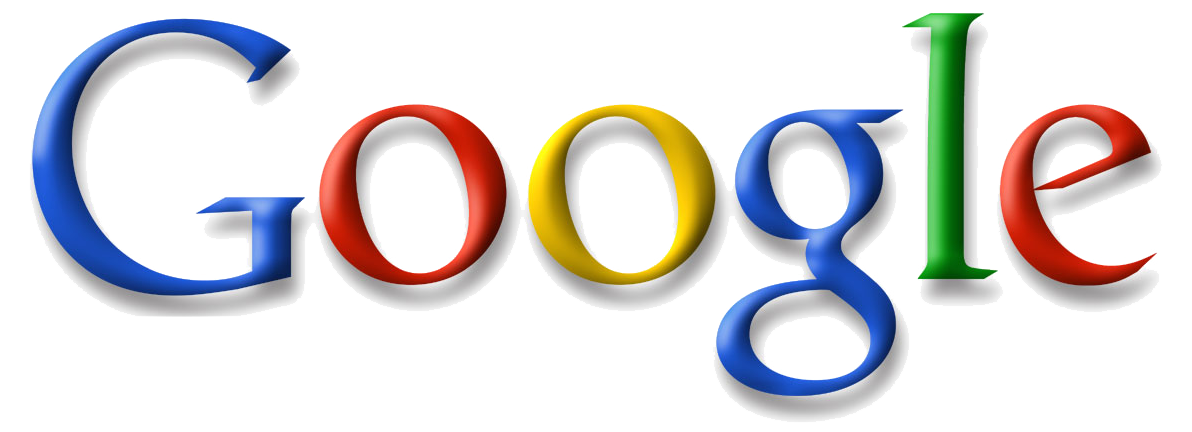
Google was the dominant search engine in 2004 and made an initial public offering of $1.7 billion.

The economy in 2004 grew steadily without significant interruptions. The gross world product grew by 4% in 2004, an increase from the 2.8% growth in 2003. The highest growth came from the developing world. International trade increased by over 10%. Governments in the developed world tightened monetary policy and central banks raised their interest rates, in contrast with expectations set at the beginning of the year. The United States dollar depreciated as the American trade deficit increased, while surpluses in Japan and the European Union led to appreciation for the Japanese yen and the euro. The valuation of the Chinese renminbi was a subject of international debate as it was tied to the US dollar.

The global economy had recovered from the early 2000s recession by 2004. The greatest recovery took place in Japan and the United States. Stock markets performed well globally in early months as economic recovery appeared strong, but downturns occurred later in the year. China became the largest recipient of foreign direct investment, exceeding that received by the United States. Doha Development Round negotiations resumed in August after their failure in 2003, and a framework was agreed upon for developed countries to limit agricultural subsidies and reduce tariffs. The United States signed a free trade agreement with several Central American countries, and another agreement with Australia.

Growing demand for oil led oil prices to increase by over 50%, which was followed by a smaller decrease in price, but the global economy accommodated the price increase without significant inflation or price shock; speculation on oil further increased its price. Coffee prices rose in 2004 after a years-long decline that had reduced its supply. Most metals, including gold, steel and aluminum, also rose in price significantly. Transportation industries like airlines and car manufacturers fared poorly throughout the year, though Toyota grew to become the second largest car manufacturing company after General Motors. The World Trade Organization objected to agricultural subsidies for sugar in the European Union and cotton in the United States due to fears that they would negatively affect global prices.

Initial public offerings (IPO) from technology companies amounted to $10.7 billion in 2004, including the $1.7 billion IPO of Google, significantly exceeding the $3.3 billion of technology company IPOs in 2003. Google emerged as the dominant search engine by 2004 and made its initial public offering in August by public auction. Internet advertising in 2004 exceeded the rates that it had achieved prior to a downturn caused by the dot-com bubble burst in 2000, totaling $2.37 billion. The largest Russian oil company, Yukos, was partially dismantled by the government after finding it owed back taxes. The retail company Kmart announced its intention in November to acquire its competitor Sears and create Sears Holdings. Oracle Corporation succeeded in its hostile takeover of PeopleSoft in December for $10.3 billion. SCO Group was unable to advance its dispute against IBM regarding ownership of Unix and Linux. Cunard Line launched the RMS Queen Mary 2 in January.

== Environment and weather ==
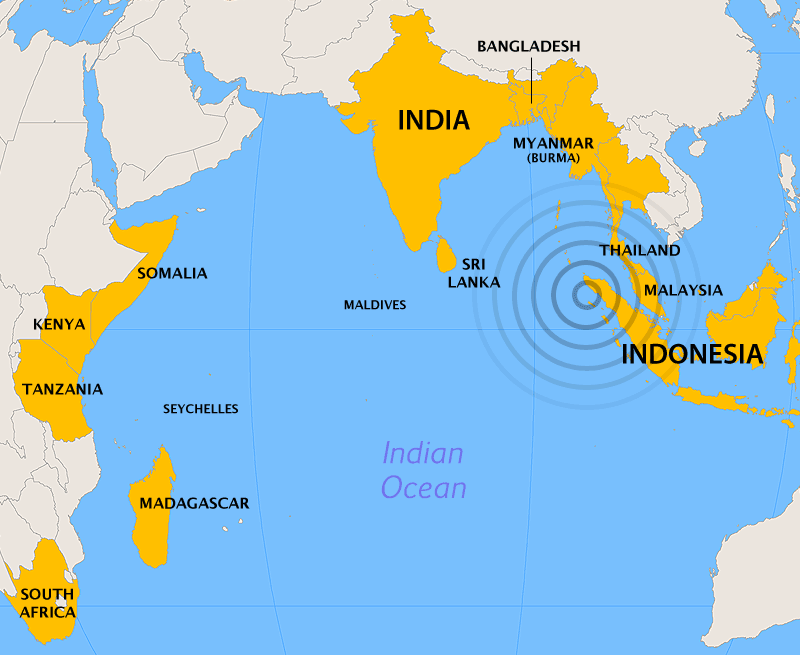
A magnitude 9.1 earthquake caused damage across the Indian Ocean in December.

The year 2004 was the fourth hottest year on record, and it was the first in four years to have above-average precipitation. Major heat waves occurred in Australia, Japan, and Spain, while deadly cold waves occurred in Peru and southern Asia. Heavy winter storms occurred in the Middle East and around the Mediterranean. Ongoing droughts continued in the Horn of Africa and the western United States, while deadly floods occurred in Brazil and on the Mexico–United States border.

A magnitude 9.1 earthquake struck Indonesia on December 26. This was the largest earthquake anywhere since a magnitude 9.2 earthquake struck Alaska in 1964. The 2004 earthquake and the resulting tsunami killed approximately 230,000 people across the region, and the tsunami affected countries across the Indian Ocean in both Asia and Africa. This included the destruction of the Indonesian city Banda Aceh. As the year closed, the earthquake was recognized as a defining event of 2004.

There were 15 named storms in the 2004 Atlantic hurricane season, nine of which were hurricanes. The most intense storms were Hurricane Ivan, Hurricane Charley, Hurricane Frances, and Hurricane Karl. It was the second deadliest hurricane season of the previous 30 years, as Hurricane Jeanne killed over 3,000 people in Haiti as well as leaving hundreds of thousands of people homeless. There were 31 tropical storms in the 2004 Pacific typhoon season, 21 of which were typhoons. The most intense typhoons were Typhoon Dianmu, Typhoon Chaba, Typhoon Nida, and Typhoon Ma-on. Seven tropical storms made landfall in Japan, and it suffered the most typhoon strikes since 1982 with four typhoons. Typhoon Rananim, the strongest typhoon to strike eastern China in five decades, destroyed 42,400 homes. Typhoon Muifa and Typhoon Nanmadol killed a combined total of 1,375 people in Philippines.

While the existence of man-made climate change had been confirmed by 2004, efforts continued to produce models that could accurately measure and predict its severity as greenhouse gas emissions increased globally. Special attention was paid to the relationship between climate change and air pollution, as well as potential effects of abrupt climate change like the shut down of thermohaline circulation and the destruction of the Greenland ice sheet. A four-year study of Arctic conditions resulted in the Arctic Climate Impact Assessment. Several studies throughout the year demonstrated significant potential for human-caused extinction of biodiversity from climate change, deforestation, and other causes. Poland banned the use of chlorofluorocarbons on April 14, with most restrictions effective immediately. This was followed by a conference in June where Coca-Cola, McDonald's, and Unilever agreed to phase out chlorofluorocarbons.

After expressing reservations, Russia ratified the Kyoto Protocol on November 5, which allowed it to take effect the following year without the involvement of the United States. Several other ratifiers, including Italy, Finland, and Spain, protested the requirements it imposed. The Rotterdam Convention entered into force in February, requiring informed consent to export certain harmful chemicals. The Stockholm Convention on Persistent Organic Pollutants, an international treaty regulating persistent organic pollutants, came into force on May 17. The International Treaty on Plant Genetic Resources for Food and Agriculture came into effect on June 29. The 2004 United Nations Climate Change Conference took place in Buenos Aires, Argentina, in December.

== Health ==
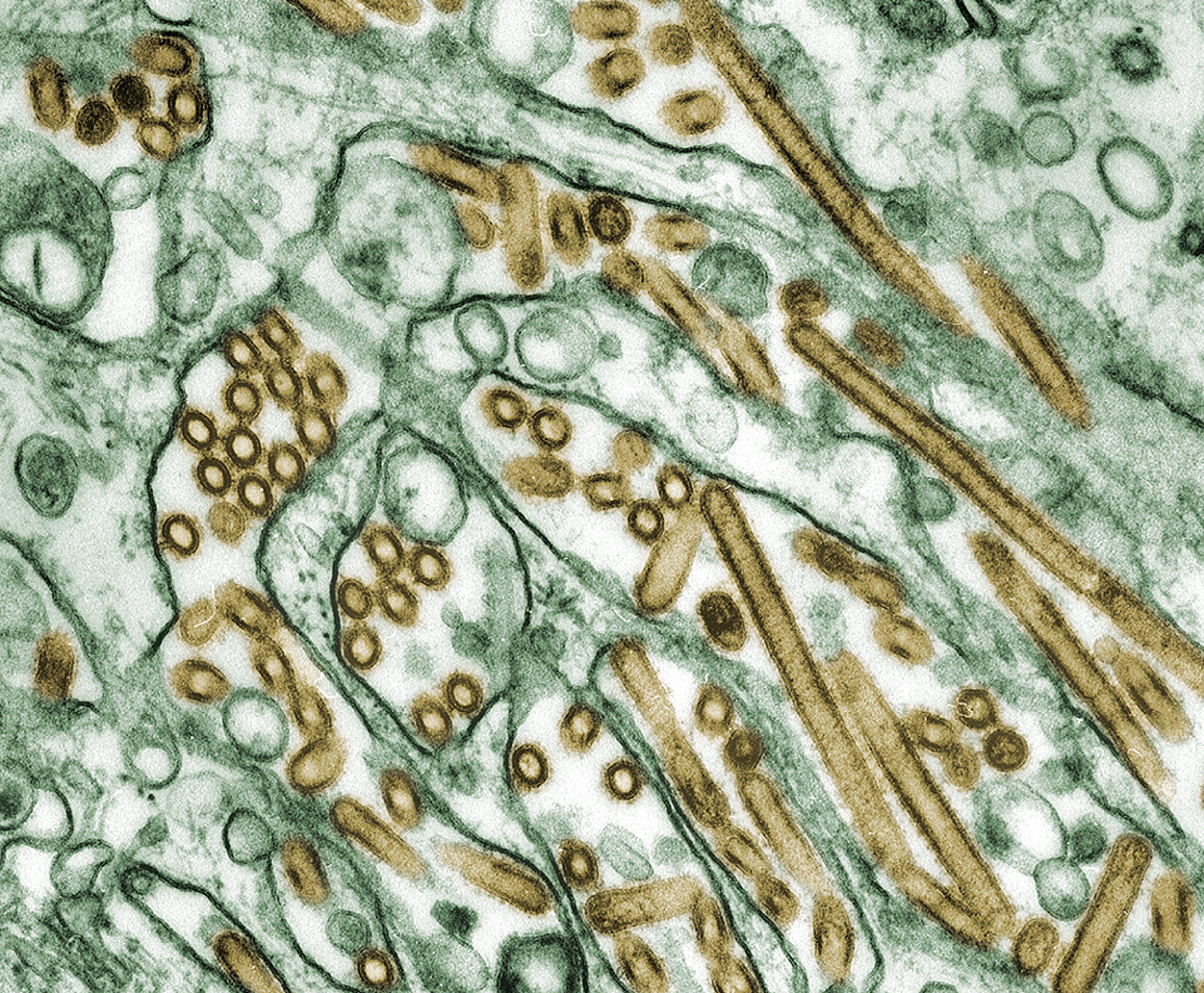
The H5N1 virus spurred fears of a possible pandemic.

The primary health concern of 2004 was the potential of an avian influenza pandemic during the spread of H5N1 in eastern and southeastern Asia. Only 44 human cases were documented between January and October, but 32 of them resulted in death. The high mortality rate expedited production of H5N1 vaccines. This was accompanied by research into the Spanish flu that involved reconstructions of the virus's genes and infected tissue.

American exportation of beef was halted throughout 2004 following the detection of bovine spongiform encephalopathy. A locust outbreak spread across western Africa in July and August, causing food shortages throughout the region, while the War in Darfur led to a severe food crisis in Sudan. The HIV/AIDS pandemic remained a predominant public health concern, and the 2004 Report on the Global AIDS Epidemic was released prior to the year's International AIDS Conference, warning that HIV/AIDS cases were rising quickly. Tuberculosis deaths increased in 2004 for the first time in over 40 years as a result of drug resistant strains and comorbidity with HIV. The global SARS epidemic and the West Nile virus outbreak in the United States both receded in 2004 with significant drops in documented cases relative to 2003.

Trials for new drugs included cotrimoxazole for HIV/AIDS, OZ 277 and the Mosquirix vaccine for malaria, and statins to lower cholesterol. Merck & Co. pulled the arthritis drug rofecoxib in September because it increased the risk of heart attack and stroke, leading to renewed scrutiny of pharmaceuticals and calls for reform in the United States.

== Politics and law ==
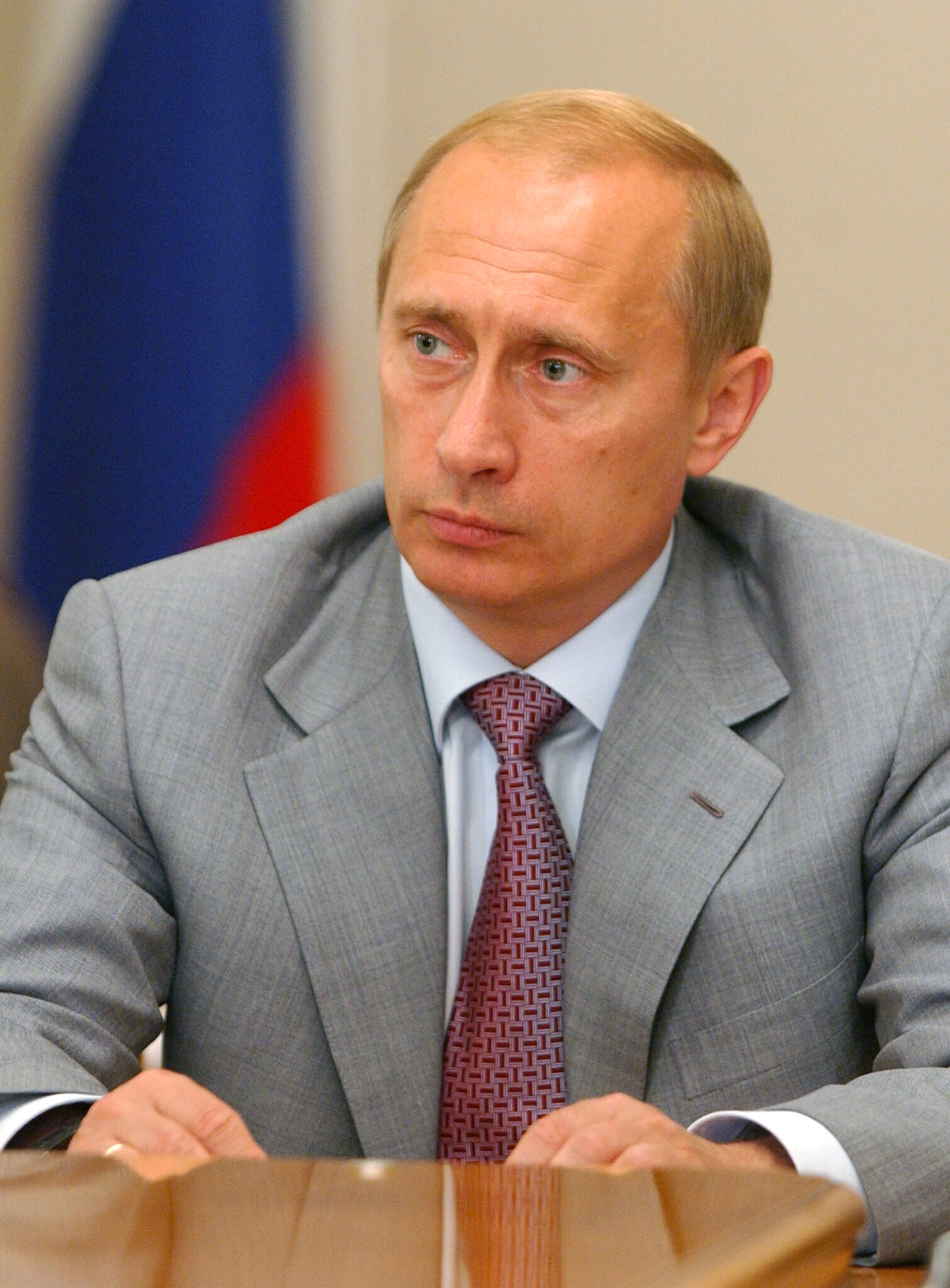
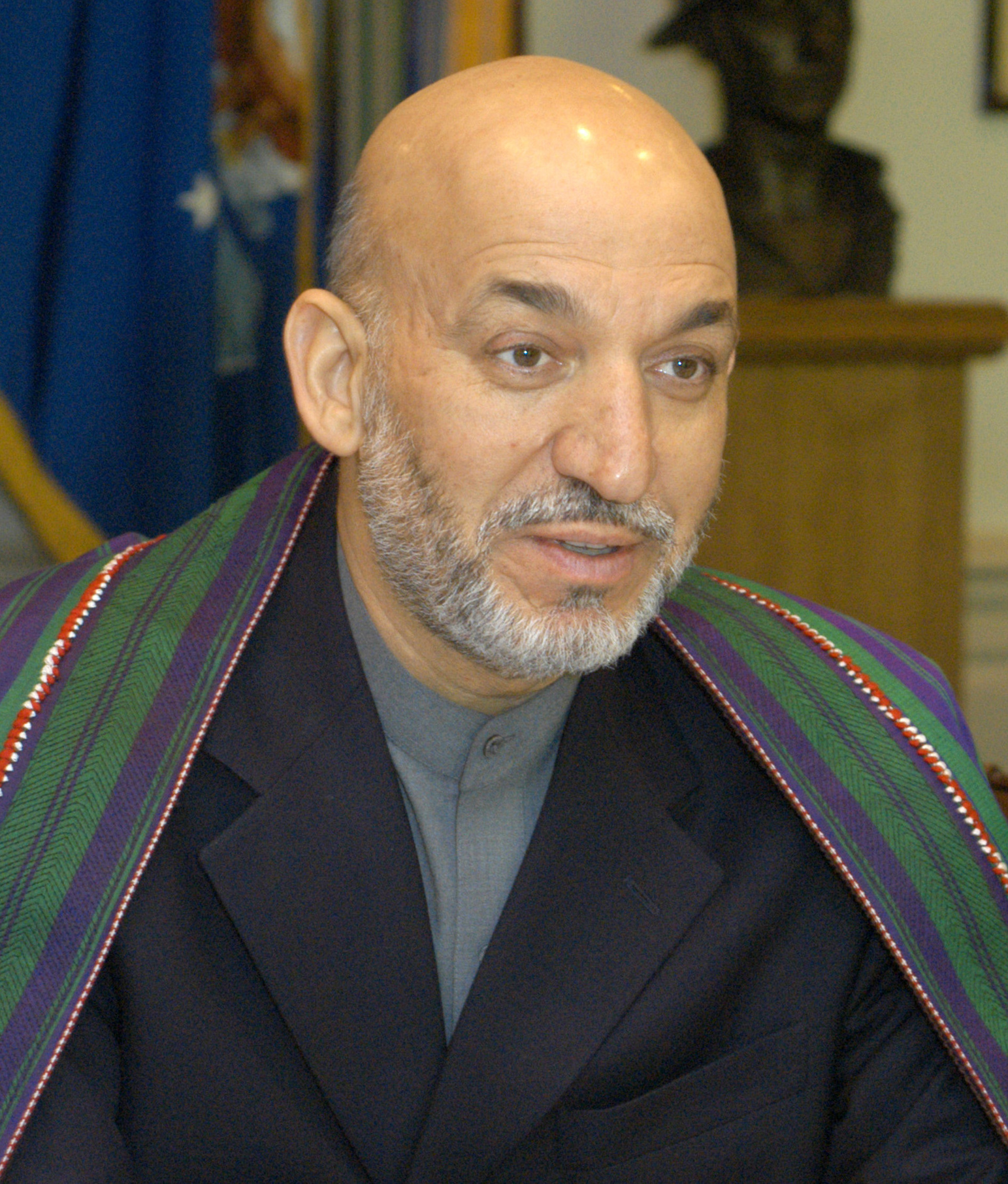
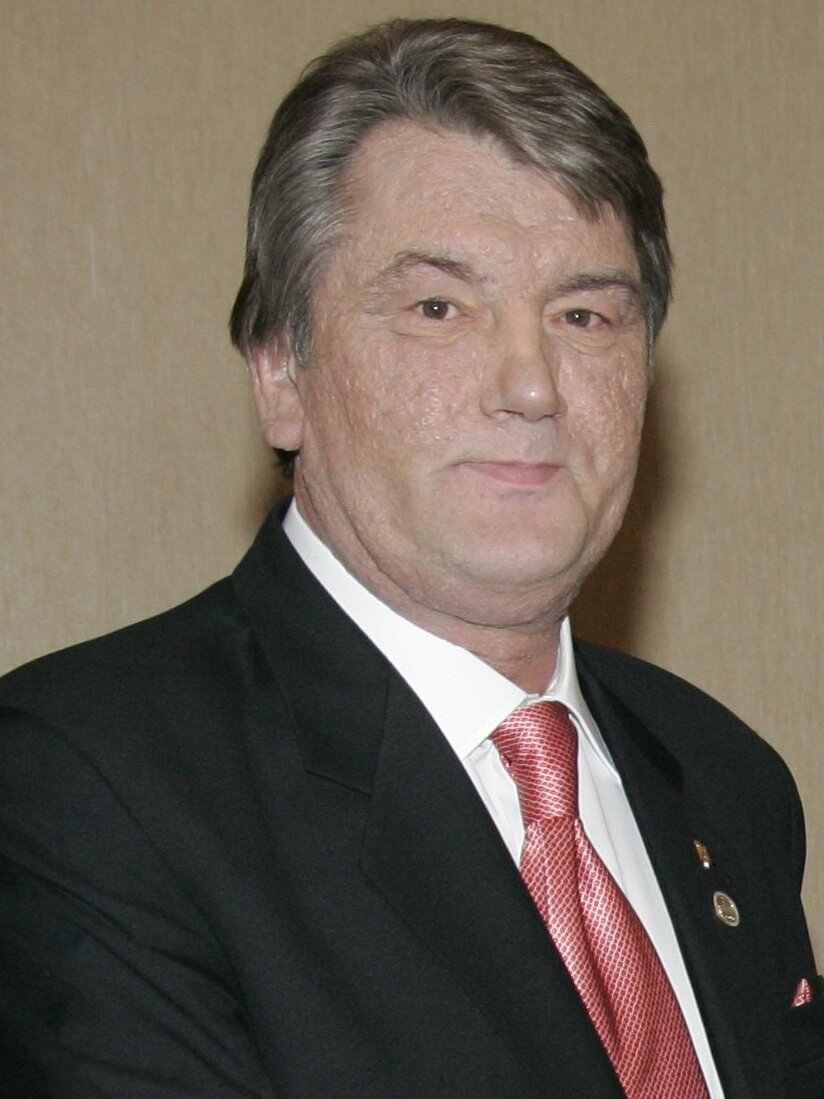
Clockwise from upper left: George W. Bush (United States), Vladimir Putin (Russia), Viktor Yushchenko (Ukraine), and Hamid Karzai (Afghanistan)

Seven Eastern European nations were incorporated into NATO, bringing the defense alliance to 26 members. Ten countries joined the European Union in May, and the organization signed an agreement toward the creation of a constitution. Bulgaria, Romania, and Turkey were refused entry. Disagreements remained over whether the European Union should be constitutionally Christian.

George W. Bush was reelected to a second term as president of the United States. Vladimir Putin was re-elected as president of Russia. Manmohan Singh became the first Sikh prime minister of India following the victory of his Indian National Congress party in May; he was favored after Sonia Gandhi was met with opposition from Hindu nationalists. Hamid Karzai won Afghanistan's first presidential election, but his government did not control significant territory outside of the capital, Kabul, as the rest of the country was occupied by warlords. The Ukrainian presidential election was disputed due to election fraud, voiding the victory of Viktor Yanukovych following political upheaval; Viktor Yushchenko won in the re-run election, and the Constitution of Ukraine was amended in response to the affair. President Jean-Bertrand Aristide of Haiti fled the country after a coup on February 29 under pressure from the United States. Yasser Arafat, the leader of Palestine and main figure in the Palestinian nationalism movement, died in November and was succeeded by Mahmoud Abbas until an election could take place the following year; Arafat's death prompted questions about the movement's direction.

Iranian and North Korean nuclear programs were brought under scrutiny in 2004, and an explosion in North Korea on September 9 raised fears of possible nuclear weapons testing. Abdul Qadeer Khan, a leading figure in the development of Pakistan's nuclear weapons, was discovered to have been trading nuclear secrets to Iran, Iraq, Libya, and North Korea. South Korea was also found to be developing a nuclear weapons program despite being involved in anti-proliferation efforts.

Other political developments in 2004 include but not limited to–protests against high crime rates in several Latin American countries, the removal of the death penalty in the majority of countries following its abolition in Bhutan and Samoa, and the indictment of Macedonian interior minister Ljube Boškoski for involvement in the 2002 Raštanski Lozja killings. Elsewhere, Augusto Pinochet in Chile, Luis Echeverría in Mexico, and Slobodan Milošević in Serbia faced allegations of crimes against humanity.

=== War on terror ===
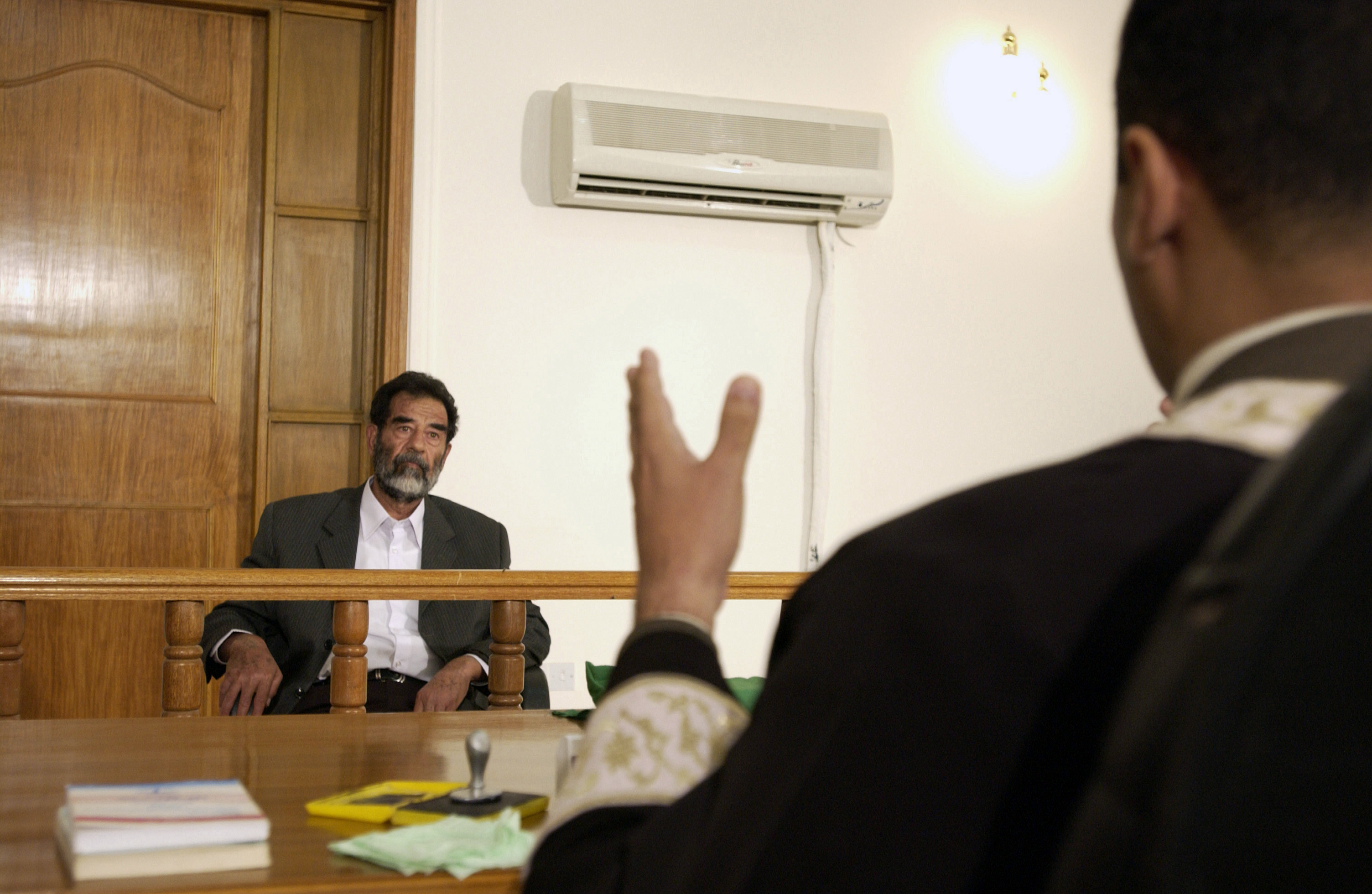
Saddam Hussein on trial

A provisional government was created in Iraq under Prime Minister Ayad Allawi in June, succeeding the American-run Coalition Provisional Authority. The United States retained control of institutions such as national defense and the prison system, causing legal ambiguity over whether the nation should still be considered under occupation.

Western involvement in Iraq grew unpopular as human rights abuses were uncovered, violence led to civilian casualties, and the rationale for the Iraq War was found to be misleading. The Iraq Survey Group was unable to find evidence of the weapons of mass destruction in Iraq that had been used to justify the invasion. It was shown in May that American soldiers were committing acts of torture against people held in the Abu Ghraib prison in Iraq, leading to the conviction of several American soldiers in military courts. This accompanied the controversial use of the Guantanamo Bay detention camp to hold suspected terrorists without due process. The United States sought compromise with allies that had opposed the invasion of Iraq, and it proposed a mutual goal of Iraqi reconstruction.

Deposed Iraqi president Saddam Hussein appeared in court in July on charges of committing genocide during his rule. His trial was held under the Supreme Iraqi Criminal Tribunal, which was created by the United States and operated under Iraqi law. Hussein contested the tribunal's legitimacy and there were calls to hold an international tribunal.

The United Kingdom and the United States passed anti-terrorism legislation and initiated surveillance programs as part of the war on terror, prompting concerns about infringement of civil rights. Osama bin Laden released a video on October 29 where he claimed responsibility for the September 11 attacks.

=== International law ===
The International Court of Justice made two rulings in 2004: it ruled in the Avena case that the United States had violated its obligations to the Vienna Convention on Consular Relations when prosecuting Mexican nationals, and that it had no jurisdiction in the Legality of Use of Force case brought by Serbia and Montenegro against NATO nations. It also issued an advisory opinion arguing that the construction of the West Bank barrier violated the Palestinian people's right to self-determination. Two border disputes, Romania v. Ukraine and Benin v. Niger, were brought before the court in 2004.

The International Criminal Court (ICC) opened its first two investigations: one in Uganda and one in the Democratic Republic of the Congo. The United States did not receive an extension on American immunity from the ICC, so it instead negotiated bilateral treaties with other nations to prevent them from turning Americans over to the court. The International Criminal Tribunal for Rwanda convicted Emmanuel Ndindabahizi, Jean de Dieu Kamuhanda, and Samuel Imanishimwe of genocide. The trial of Slobodan Milošević began under the International Criminal Tribunal for the former Yugoslavia, while appeals by Radislav Krstić and Tihomir Blaškić resulted in lesser charges and reductions in their sentences.

== Religion ==
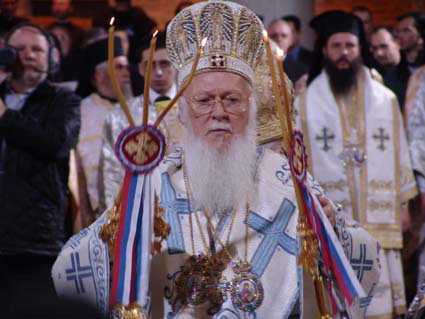
Bartholomew I of Constantinople was the first Orthodox patriarch to visit Latin America.

The sexual abuse scandals of the Catholic Church further developed in 2004 with resignations and legal proceedings. The Catholic Church returned the relics of John Chrysostom and Gregory of Nazianzus to Istanbul. Within Eastern Orthodoxy, Bartholomew I of Constantinople suspended relations with Christodoulos of Athens. Bartholomew accepted an apology from the Roman Catholic Church for the 1204 sack of Constantinople. The St Nicholas of Myra Cathedral of Havana, the first religious building to be constructed in Cuba since the Cuban Revolution, was consecrated by Bartholomew in January; this was the first time an Orthodox patriarch visited Latin America. Eastern Orthodox Church leader Patriarch Peter VII of Alexandria died in a helicopter crash in 2004.

The issue of gay rights remained incredibly divisive among different Anglican groups and caused schisms, especially in the United States where the Episcopal Church was more accepting of same-sex partnerships. The Anglican Communion released the Windsor Report that condemned the selection of Gene Robinson, a gay man, as a bishop in the United States. The United Methodist Church responded by announcing its opposition to the ordination of gay bishops. Also in the United States, the Southern Baptist Convention ended its connection with the Baptist World Alliance for being too liberal.

Several Christian groups, including the Presbyterian Church, World Council of Churches, and the Lutheran World Federation, had relations sour with Jewish groups after criticizing Israeli actions against Palestine. Disagreement emerged among Jews in Israel when Chief Rabbi Avraham Shapira declared that Orthodox Jews should disregard orders to dismantle Israeli settlements in Gaza.

Religious violence remained a major issue within the Islamic world as religious leaders condemned attacks led by Islamist groups, and Islamic organizations held several summits in favor of religious tolerance and opposition to Islamism. The overthrow of Ba'athist Iraq in 2003 meant increased religious tension between Sunni and Shia sects of Islam within the country. The Sankararaman murder case caused controversy following the death of temple manager Sankara Raman in the Hindu monastery Kanchi Kamakoti Peetham. Several countries saw continued debates on religion in education, and France issued a highly contested ban on religious attire in public schools.

== Science ==
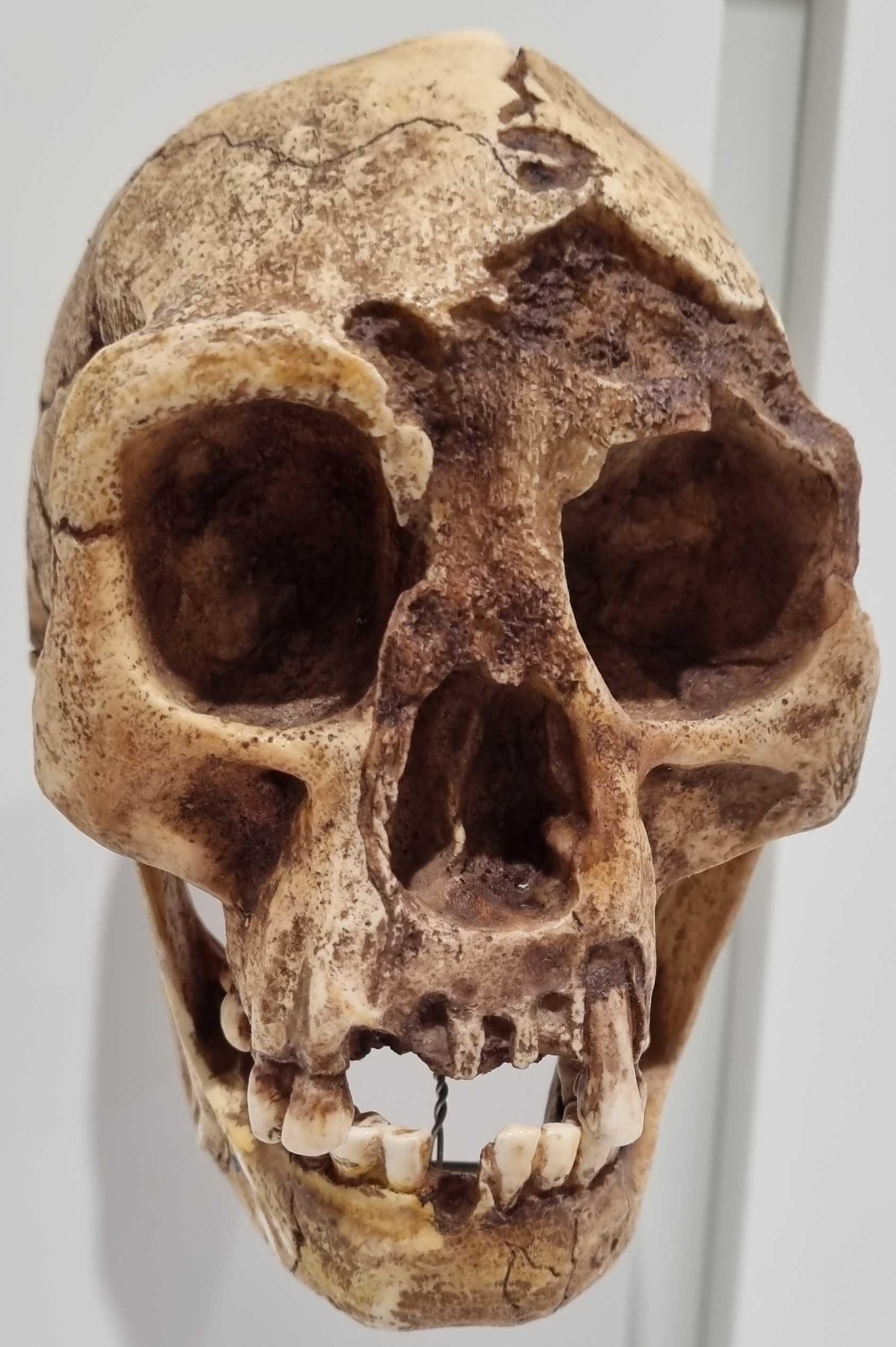
The prehistoric human species Homo floresiensis was discovered in 2004.

Study continued in the use of embryos to create stem cells for research purposes. Debate around stem cell usage occurred worldwide, and the United Nations was unable to agree on international law related to human cloning for the creation of stem cells. Several studies of the relationship between humans and other hominids were completed in 2004, including a preliminary genome sequence for chimpanzees. A newborn western gorilla was observed for the first time in 50 years in the Léfini Faunal Reserve. An early human species with small body proportions, Homo floresiensis, was announced with the discovery of the Flores man fossil. The fossil was discovered in the Liang Bua archaeological site on the Indonesian island of Flores. Announced on October 28, there had previously been no expectation of another human species in the area.

The post-perovskite crystal structure was discovered when perovskite was placed under extreme pressure and temperature. Research continued on the development and application of carbon nanotubes in the United Kingdom, prompting the Royal Society and the Royal Academy of Engineering to propose their classification as a new chemical. Independent experiments in 2004 successfully produced quantum teleportation in particles and ions. Magnetic resonance force microscopy was used to observe a single electron for the first time.

Global warming was a major focus of the scientific community as results came in on sea level rise. A map of Earth's gravitational field was released in 2004 based on the results of the 2002 GRACE and GRACE-FO study, with ten times the resolution of previous maps. A study by American and Italian researchers demonstrated a more precise form of interferometric synthetic-aperture radar to measure the deformation caused by tectonic activity.

Over 70 archaeological sites were established in the Petén Basin in Guatemala. The Pool of Siloam, a major reservoir from ancient Jerusalem, was discovered in the process of building a sewer pipe.

=== Astronomy and space exploration ===
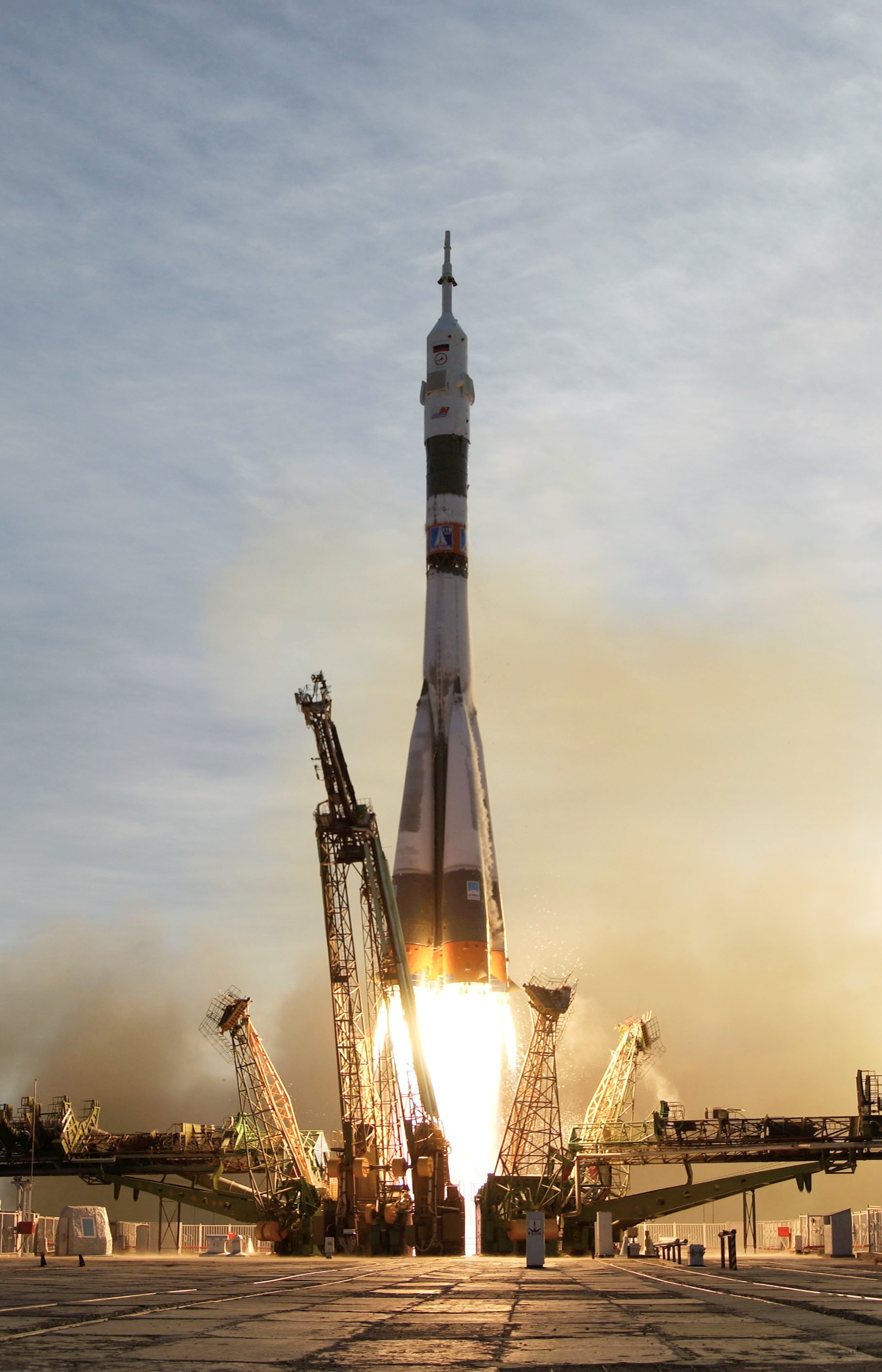
The Soyuz program was the only crewed space program in 2004 (Soyuz TMA-5 pictured).

NASA paused its Space Shuttle program following the previous year's explosion of the Space Shuttle Columbia, meaning the only crewed flights in 2004 were part of Russia's Soyuz program. The Mars Exploration Rover program continued with the landing of the Spirit rover on January 4 and the Opportunity rover on January 25. They provided evidence that Mars once had seas, prompting NASA to extend the rovers' mission to the end of the year. NASA's Cassini–Huygens achieved orbit around Saturn in July. It took images of Saturn's features, including infrared imaging of its rings, and released the ESA's Huygens lander in December to study the moon Titan. The ESA's SMART-1 satellite achieved orbit around the Moon in November, and NASA's Genesis probe returned to Earth in September but was damaged in a failed landing. Venus's path led it between the Earth and the Sun for the first time since 1882. The Hubble Ultra-Deep Field image was released in March.

Spacecraft launches in 2004 included the European Space Agency (ESA)'s Rosetta probe on March 2 to study the comet 67P/Churyumov–Gerasimenko, NASA's MESSENGER probe toward Mercury in August, a private spaceflight of the SpaceShipOne by Burt Rutan in October, and NASA's Neil Gehrels Swift Observatory (then called the Swift Gamma-Ray Burst Explorer) launch into orbit in November to study gamma-ray bursts. The Gravity Probe B, Double Star, and Aura satellites were also launched in 2004.

=== Technology ===
Wireless technology grew in popularity with the proliferation of devices like Pocket PCs and portable media players, while high-definition television and digital video recorders became more widely available. Laptops increased in popularity as they approached the computing power of desktop computers, and as Wi-Fi became more accessible. Flash drives grew more popular while floppy disks and personal digital assistants saw continued decline. 3G technology was more widely adopted in Europe, while NTT DoCoMo began early trials for 4G technology in Japan.

Microsoft entered 2004 with a monopoly over web browsers through Internet Explorer, but its share of the market was reduced to about 90 percent following the introduction of Firefox. Open-source software was incentivized and in some cases legally mandated by South American countries throughout the year. Google released the first version of Gmail in April. Malware attacks rose in early 2004, primarily through the Netsky and Sasser worms created by Sven Jaschan. Spam and phishing emails were seen as a major problem and were met with arrests and lawsuits against perpetrators.

The term nanotechnology, first coined in the 1970s, was popularized among the general public in 2004. New automobiles entering production in 2004 included the Chrysler 300 and Ford Five Hundred.

== Events ==
=== January ===
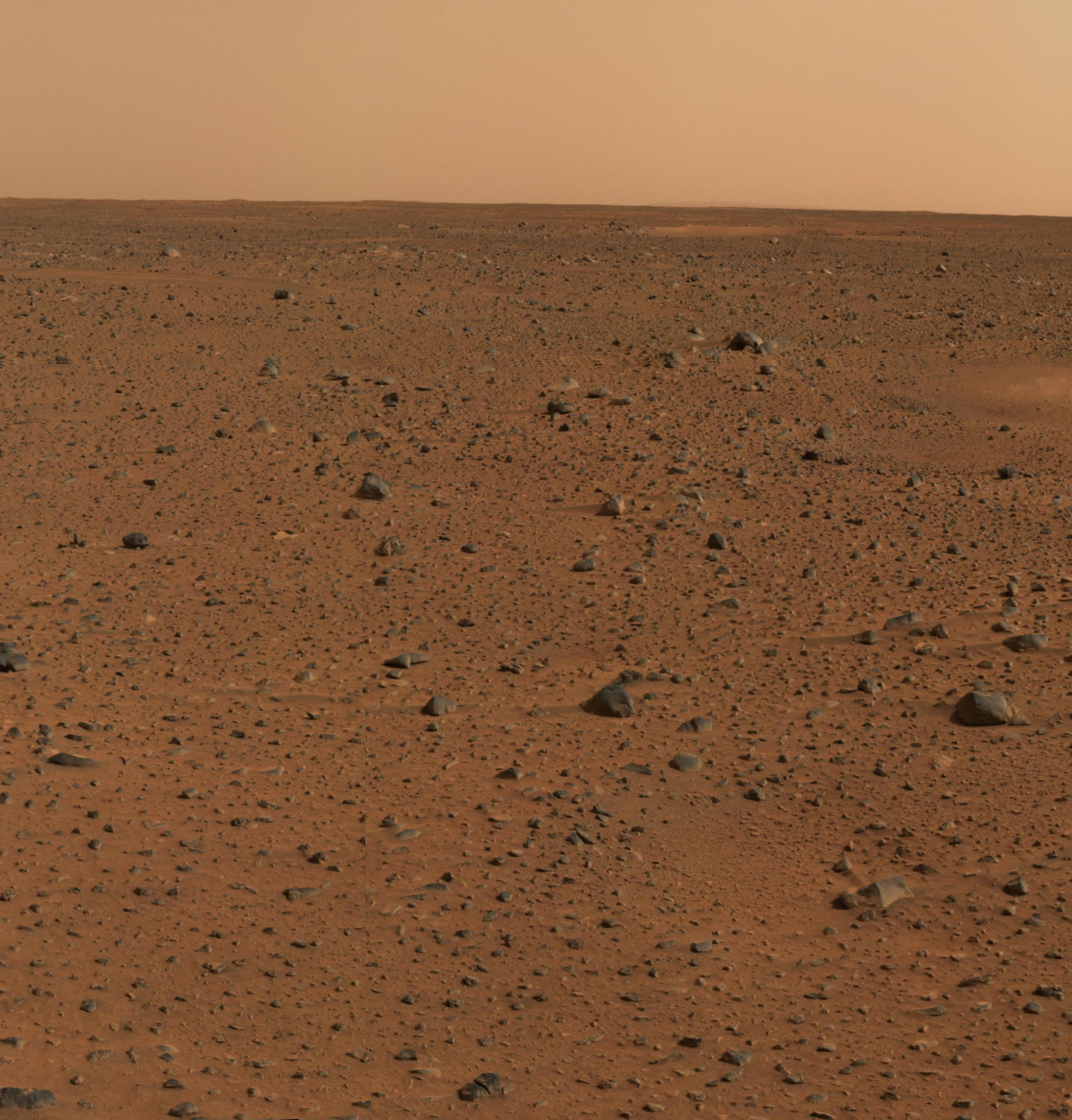
A photo of the Martian surface taken by NASA's Spirit rover

- January 4
  - NASA's Spirit rover lands on the surface of Mars.
  - An insurgency breaks out in southern Thailand.
- January 8 – The RMS Queen Mary 2, at the time the largest ocean liner ever built, is christened by its namesake's granddaughter, Queen Elizabeth II.
- January 21 – Bartholomew I of Constantinople visits Cuba.
- January 25 – NASA's Opportunity rover lands on the surface of Mars.

=== February ===
- February 1
  - Two suicide bombings are carried out by al-Qaeda in Erbil, the capital of Iraqi Kurdistan.
  - Janet Jackson suffers a wardrobe malfunction during the halftime show of Super Bowl XXXVIII.
- February 24 – The Rotterdam Convention comes into force.
- February 29 – Haitian president Jean-Bertrand Aristide is overthrown in a coup d'état.

=== March ===
- March 2
  - A series of bombings occur in Karbala, Iraq, killing over 140 Shia Muslims commemorating the Day of Ashura.
  - The European Space Agency launches the Rosetta space probe.
- March 9 – NASA releases the Hubble Ultra-Deep Field image of early galaxies.
- March 11 – Al-Qaeda bombings on Cercanías trains in Madrid, Spain, kill at least 192 people.
- March 14 – Vladimir Putin is reelected president of Russia with 71.2 percent of the vote.
- March 17 – Ethnic violence breaks out in Kosovo between Albanians and Serbs.
- March 22 – Hamas leader Ahmed Yassin is killed by Israeli missile strikes.
- March 28 – Bombings attributed to the Islamic Movement of Uzbekistan kill 15 in Tashkent, the capital of Uzbekistan. This is the first instance of suicide bombings in the country or the surrounding region of central Asia.
- March 29 – Bulgaria, Estonia, Latvia, Lithuania, Romania, Slovakia and Slovenia are admitted to NATO, the largest expansion of the organization.
- March 30 – The Communist Party of Nepal (Maoist) abducts over 1,000 people from the Bajura District to fight in the Nepalese Civil War.
- March 31
  - Four American security contractors are killed in Fallujah, Iraq, leading to the First Battle of Fallujah.
  - The International Court of Justice rules in the Avena case that the United States had violated its obligations to the Vienna Convention on Consular Relations when prosecuting Mexican nationals.

=== April ===
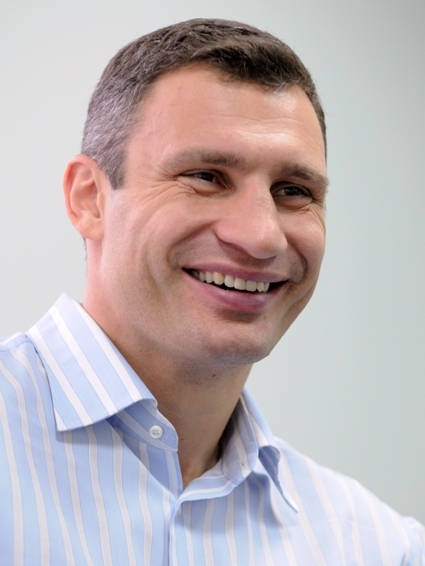
Vitali Klitschko became the WBC world heavyweight champion on April 24.

- April 1 – Google launches Gmail.
- April 4
  - The Siege of Sadr City begins when the Mahdi Army ambushes American soldiers in Sadr City, Iraq.
  - The United Nations Operation in Côte d'Ivoire begins to maintain a ceasefire in the First Ivorian Civil War.
- April 8 – The Humanitarian Ceasefire Agreement is signed by the Sudanese government and two rebel groups to create a ceasefire in the War in Darfur.
- April 13 – A newborn western gorilla is observed for the first time in 50 years in the Léfini Faunal Reserve.
- April 14 – Poland bans the use of chlorofluorocarbons.
- April 17 – Israeli helicopters fire missiles at a convoy of vehicles in the Gaza Strip, killing Hamas leader Abdel Aziz al-Rantisi.
- April 18 – Newly elected prime minister of Spain, José Luis Rodríguez Zapatero, announces the withdrawal of all 1,300 Spanish troops from Iraq.
- April 19 – Russia launches the Soyuz TMA-4 mission.
- April 24 – Ukrainian boxer Vitali Klitschko becomes the WBC world heavyweight champion after defeating his opponent Corrie Sanders.
- April 28 – The Gherkin opens in London.
- April 30 – Patriarch Bartholomew I of Constantinople breaks Eucharistic communion with Archbishop Christodoulos of Athens.

=== May ===
Garçon à la pipe sold at auction for $104.2 million.

- May 1 – The European Union expands by 10 new member states: Cyprus, the Czech Republic, Estonia, Hungary, Latvia, Lithuania, Malta, Poland, Slovakia, and Slovenia.
- May 5 – Garçon à la pipe, painted by Pablo Picasso in 1905, is sold for $104.2 million. This was the highest price a work of art had ever been sold for at auction.
- May 7
  - Vladimir Putin is sworn in for a second term as Russia's president.
  - The discovery of the post-perovskite form of magnesium silicate is reported.
- May 9 – A stadium bombing in Grozny, Chechnya, Russia kills ten people, including regional governor Akhmad Kadyrov.
- May 12–15 – The Eurovision Song Contest 2004 takes place in Istanbul, Turkey, and is won by Ukrainian entrant Ruslana with the song "Wild Dances".
- May 13 – The Ralito II Agreement is signed between Colombia and the United Self-Defense Forces of Colombia.
- May 17 – The Stockholm Convention on Persistent Organic Pollutants enters into force.
- May 22 – Manmohan Singh, a Sikh, is sworn in as India's first non-Hindu prime minister.
- May 23 – The Seattle Central Library opens in Seattle, Washington.
- May 24 – A fire at a Momart warehouse destroys numerous works of art.

=== June ===
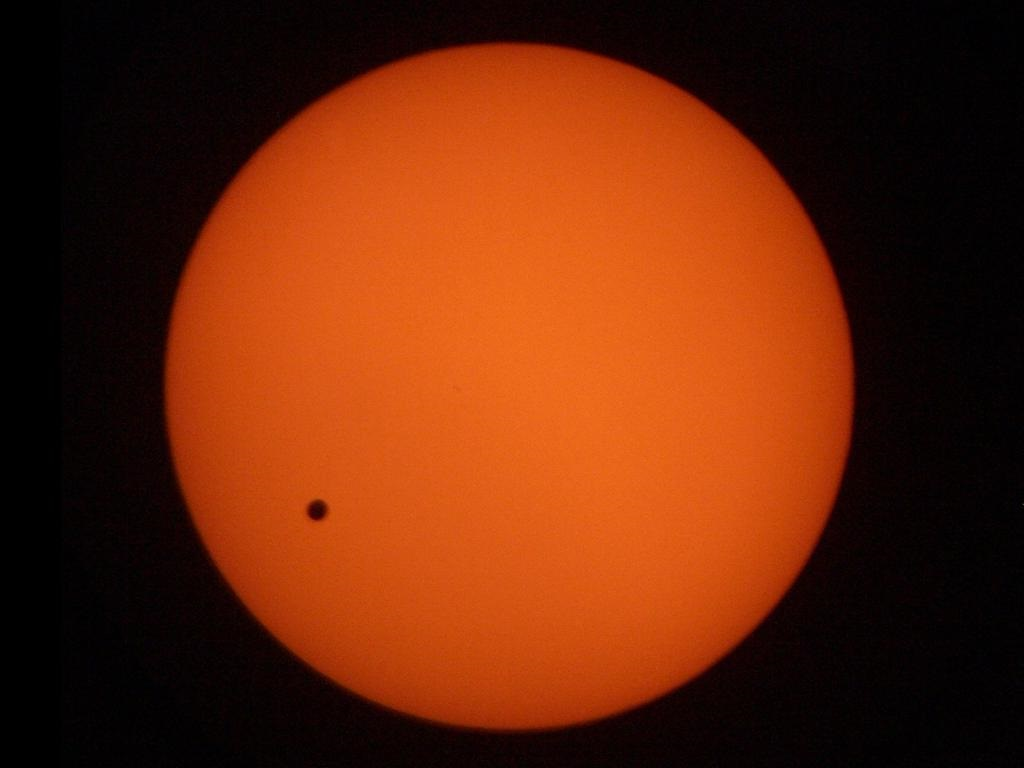
A transit of Venus took place on June 8, 2004.

- June 1 – The United Nations Stabilisation Mission in Haiti (MINUSTAH) peacekeeping mission begins in Haiti.
- June 8 – A transit of Venus occurs.
- June 21 – In Mojave, California, United States, SpaceShipOne becomes the first privately funded spaceplane to achieve spaceflight.
- June 23 – The International Criminal Court opens an investigation into crimes against humanity during the Second Congo War.
- June 28 – The US-led coalition occupying Iraq, the Coalition Provisional Authority (CPA), transfers sovereignty to the Iraqi Interim Government.
- June 29 – The International Treaty on Plant Genetic Resources for Food and Agriculture enters into force.

=== July ===
- July 1
  - Saddam Hussein appears in court for his charges to be read.
  - The Cassini–Huygens orbiter reaches the orbit of Saturn.
- July 4 – The International Court of Justice issues an advisory ruling that the construction of the West Bank barrier violates the Palestinian people's right to self-determination.
- July 15 – The use of magnetic resonance imaging to study the spin of a single electron is reported.
- July 24 – The Mexican government files charges against former President of Mexico Luis Echeverría for his role in the 1971 Corpus Christi massacre.
- July 29 – The International Criminal Court opens an investigation into the actions of the Lord's Resistance Army in Uganda.
- July 30 – The Frauenkirche church finishes reconstruction after its destruction in 1945.

=== August ===
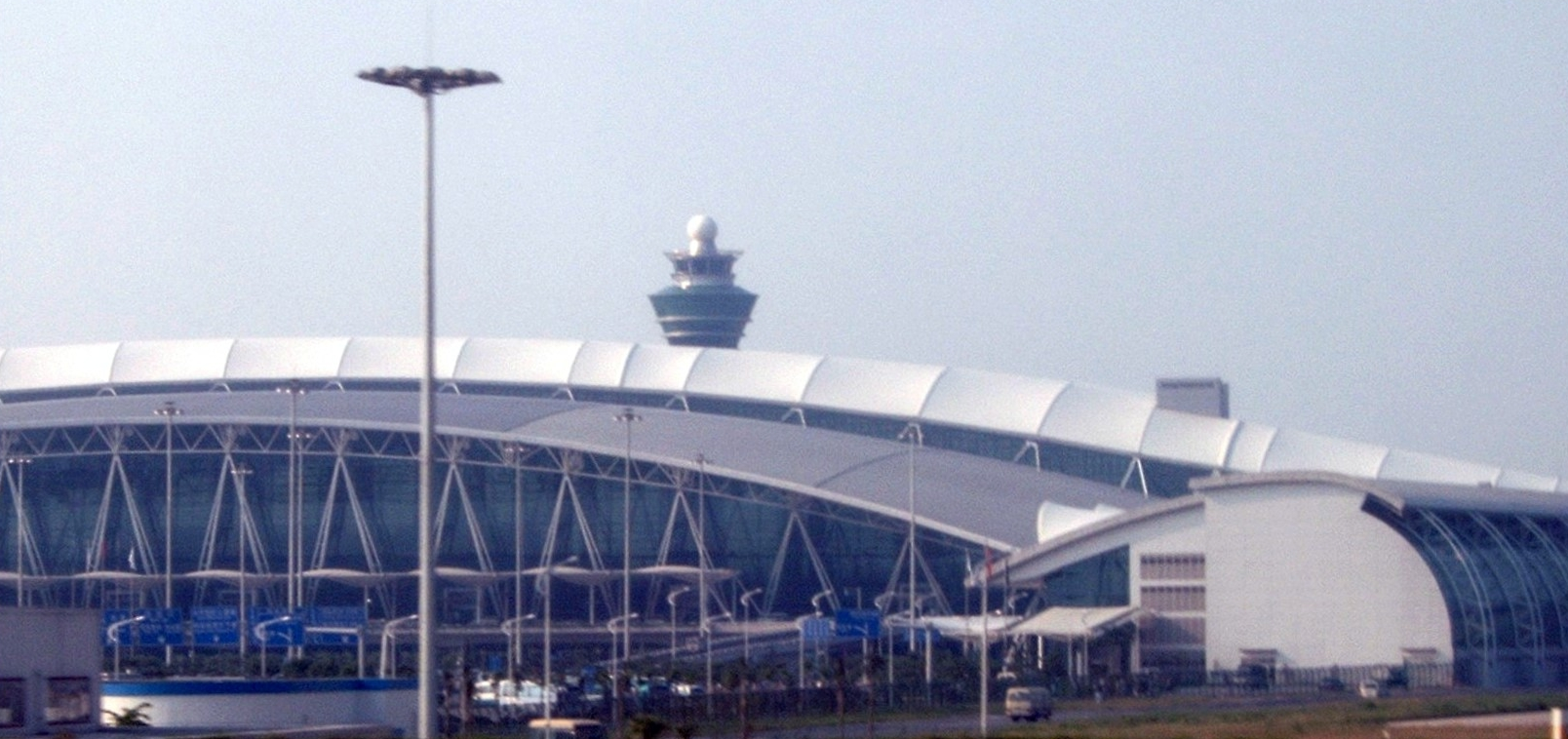
Guangzhou Baiyun International Airport began operation in August 2004.

- August 3 – NASA's MESSENGER space probe is launched, with its primary mission being the study of Mercury.
- August 5
  - The Battle of Najaf begins in Najaf, Iraq.
  - Guangzhou Baiyun International Airport begins operation in Guangzhou, China.
- August 7–13 – Typhoon Rananim causes widespread destruction as it strikes China.
- August 11 – Fighting breaks out in the Georgian–Ossetian conflict.
- August 12 – The Rio–Antirrio Bridge opens in Greece.
- August 13–29 – The 2004 Summer Olympics are held in Athens, Greece.
- August 19 – Google makes its initial public offering.
- August 22 – Armed robbers steal Edvard Munch's The Scream, Madonna, and other paintings from the Munch Museum in Oslo, Norway.
- August 24 – Two Russian passenger jets are downed by suicide bombers during the Second Chechen War.
- August 26 – The immunity of former Chilean dictator Augusto Pinochet is revoked so he can be charged with crimes against humanity.
- August 31 – Former Yugoslavian president Slobodan Milošević stands trial for crimes against humanity.

=== September ===
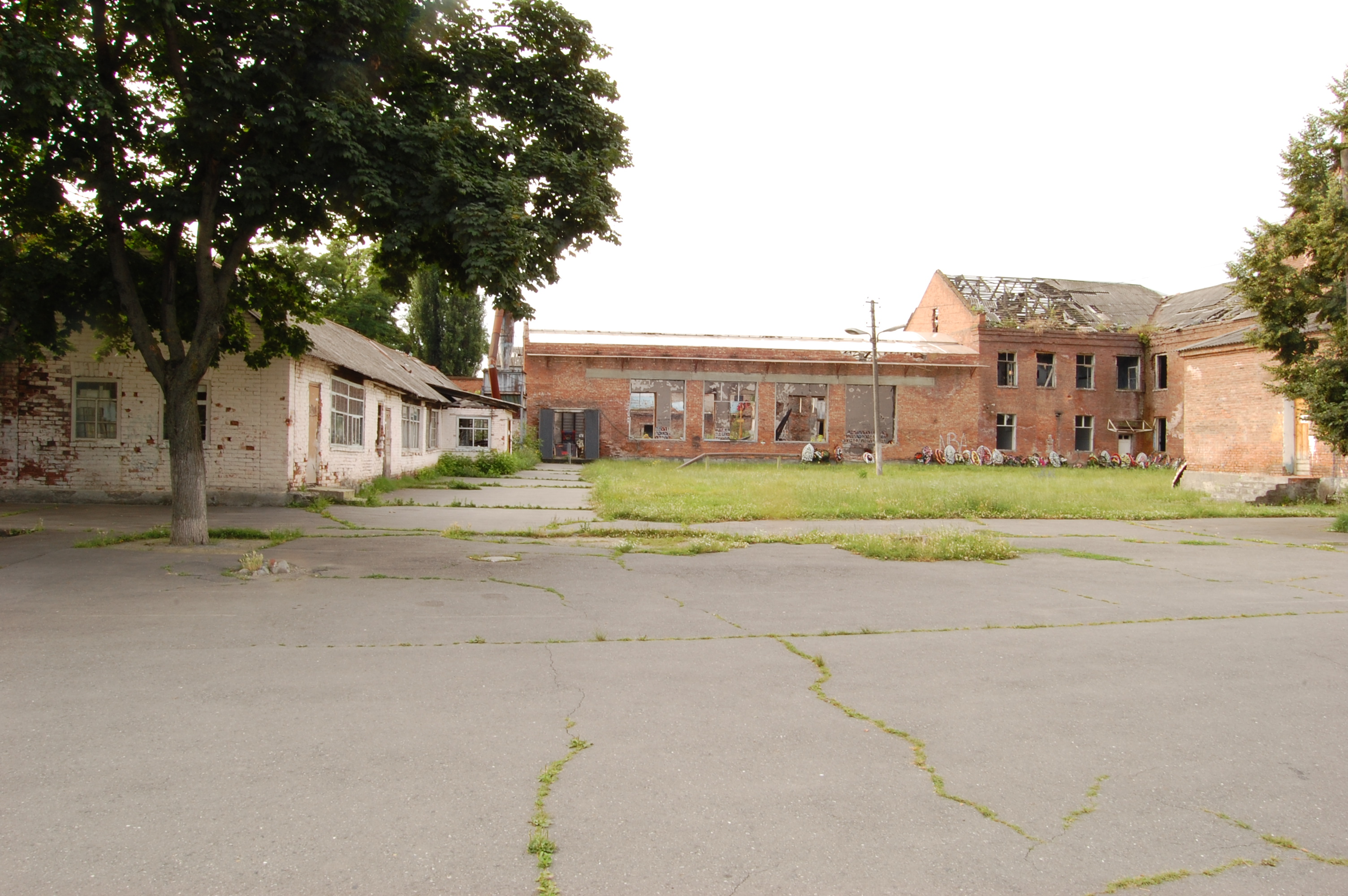
A school in Beslan, Russia, fell under siege during the Second Chechen War.

- September 1 – Chechen rebels take 1,128 hostages, mostly children, at a school in Beslan, Russia. Russian security forces eventually storm the building, resulting in more than 330 people being killed.
- September 2 – A fire breaks out at the Duchess Anna Amalia Library.
- September 4 – In the AFL finals, Essendon defeated Melbourne by five points (15.14.104 - 15.9.99) in the elimination final at the Melbourne Cricket Ground. The victory would prove to be Essendon's most recent finals win, beginning a finals drought that would extend for more than two decades.
- September 6 – Fijian golfer Vijay Singh unseats Tiger Woods as the top PGA Tour player.
- September 7 – The Scottish Parliament Building opens.
- September 8 – The Genesis space probe crash-lands in Utah after a three-year study of the Sun.
- September 9 – An explosion in Ryanggang Province, North Korea, prompts suspicion that North Korea is testing nuclear weapons.
- September 11 – Patriarch Peter VII of Alexandria is killed in a helicopter crash.
- September 16 – Hurricane Jeanne hits the island of Hispaniola, killing thousands in the Dominican Republic and Haiti.
- September 30
  - Israel launches a military offensive in the northern Gaza Strip.
  - Painkiller Vioxx is pulled from the market due to a potential doubling of heart attack risk.

=== October ===
- October 8 – Suicide bombers detonate two bombs at the Red Sea resort of Taba, Egypt, killing 34 people and injuring 171, mostly Israeli tourists.
- October 9 – Afghanistan holds its first presidential election. Hamid Karzai wins with 55.4 percent of the vote.
- October 14 – Russia launches the Soyuz TMA-5 mission.
- October 28 – The prehistoric human species Homo floresiensis is described.
- October 29
  - Osama bin Laden releases a video taking credit for the September 11 attacks.
  - European heads of state sign in Rome the Treaty and Final Act, establishing the first European Constitution.

=== November ===
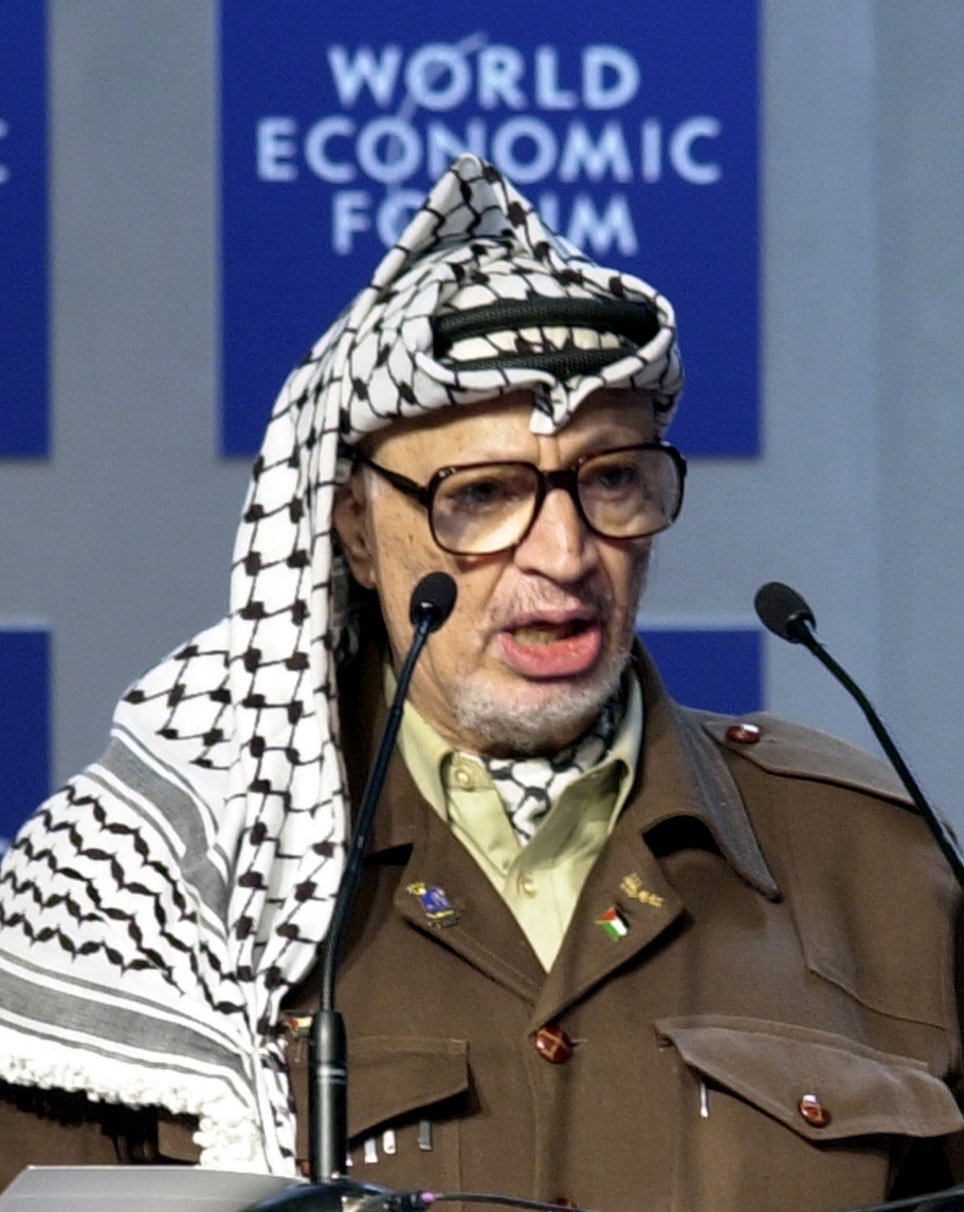
Yasser Arafat died in 2004, raising questions about who would lead the Palestinian nationalist movement.

- November 2 – George W. Bush is reelected president of the United States, defeating his challenger John Kerry.
- November 4 – Conflict resumes in the First Ivorian Civil War as fighting breaks out between rebels and French peacekeepers.
- November 5 – Russia ratifies the Kyoto Protocol.
- November 7 – The Second Battle of Fallujah begins in Fallujah, Iraq.
- November 9 – Mozilla releases the Firefox browser.
- November 11 – Palestinian president Yasser Arafat dies. Mahmoud Abbas is appointed as his successor.
- November 13 – The European Space Agency probe SMART-1 arrives at the Moon, becoming the first European satellite to fly to the Moon and orbit it.
- November 14–26 – Typhoon Muifa kills 600 people in the Philippines.
- November 15
  - The SMART-1 satellite reaches the orbit of the Moon.
  - A ceasefire is reached between Uganda and the Lord's Resistance Army.
- November 20
  - The Museum of Modern Art reopens in its new location.
  - NASA launches the Swift Gamma-Ray Burst Explorer telescope.
- November 21 – Nintendo releases the Nintendo DS handheld game console in North America.
- November 22 – The Orange Revolution begins, following a disputed presidential election in Ukraine where Viktor Yanukovych won against Viktor Yushchenko amid accusations of electoral fraud. A revote results in Yushchenko being declared the winner.
- November 29–December 3 – Typhoon Nanmadol kills 775 people in the Philippines.

=== December ===
- December 2 – EUFOR takes over peacekeeping duties in Bosnia and Herzegovina from the United Nations.
- December 14 – The world's tallest bridge, the Millau Viaduct over the Tarn in the Massif Central mountains, France, is inaugurated.
- December 21 – Iraqi insurgents attack a U.S. military base in the city of Mosul, killing 22 people.
- December 26 – The 9.1–9.3 M_{w} Indian Ocean earthquake shakes northern Sumatra with a maximum Mercalli intensity of IX (Violent). One of the largest observed tsunamis follows, affecting coastal areas of Thailand, India, Sri Lanka, Somalia, the Maldives, Malaysia, Myanmar, Bangladesh, and Indonesia, killing 227,000 people.
- December 30 – A peace agreement is reached between Senegal and the Movement of Democratic Forces of Casamance.

== Nobel Prizes ==

- Chemistry – Aaron Ciechanover, Avram Hershko, Irwin Rose
- Economics – Finn E. Kydland, Edward C. Prescott
- Literature – Elfriede Jelinek
- Peace – Wangarĩ Maathai
- Physics – David J. Gross, Hugh David Politzer, Frank Wilczek
- Physiology or Medicine – Linda B. Buck, Richard Axel

== Bibliography ==
- The Annual Register 2004. Vol. 246. Keesing's Worldwide. 2005. ISBN 1-886994-48-X.
- Dwan, Renata; Holmqvist, Caroline (2005). "Major armed conflicts". SIPRI Yearbook 2005: Armaments, Disarmament and International Security. Stockholm International Peace Research Institute. pp. 83–120. ISBN 978-0-19-928401-6.
- Franklin, James L.; Pasch, Richard J.; Avila, Lixion A.; Beven, John L.; Lawrence, Miles B.; Stewart, Stacy R.; Blake, Eric S. (2005). "Atlantic Hurricane Season of 2004". Monthly Weather Review. 134 (3): 981–1025. doi:10.1175/MWR3096.1. ISSN 1520-0493.
- Harbom, Lotta; Wallensteen, Peter (2005). "Armed Conflict and Its International Dimensions, 1946-2004". Journal of Peace Research. 42 (5): 623–635. doi:10.1177/0022343305056238. ISSN 0022-3433. JSTOR 30042372.
- Annual 2004 Global Climate Report (Report). National Oceanic and Atmospheric Administration. 2005. Archived from the original on September 10, 2024.
- Saunders, Mark; Lea, Adam (January 11, 2005). Summary of 2004 NW Pacific Typhoon Season and Verification of Authors' Seasonal Forecasts (PDF). Tropical Storm Risk (Report). University College London. Archived (PDF) from the original on June 14, 2025.
- Sparks, Karen, ed. (2005). Britannica Book of the Year 2005. Encyclopædia Britannica. ISBN 1-59339-246-X.
- Time Annual 2005. Time. 2005. ISBN 9781932273533.
- World Population Prospects 2024 (Report). United Nations Department of Economic and Social Affairs. 2024. Archived from the original on October 27, 2025.
- 2004 Global Refugee Trends (Report). United Nations High Commissioner for Refugees. 2005.
- World Economic Situation and Prospects 2005 (PDF) (Report). United Nations Department of Economic and Social Affairs. August 1, 2005. ISBN 978-92-1-109146-5.
- "Biggest News Stories of 2004". Voice of America. December 28, 2004. Archived from the original on April 20, 2025.
