= Ryanggang explosion =

2004 explosion in North Korea

Coordinates: 41°19′47″N 127°05′02″E

The Ryanggang explosion was a large explosion that took place in North Korea on 9 September 2004 in the northern province of Ryanggang. The nature and cause of the suspected explosion is the subject of speculation. No neighboring nations have claimed any detection of radioactive isotopes characteristic of a nuclear explosion.

== The suspected explosion ==
The suspected explosion occurred near Wŏltan Workers' District (Wŏltal-lodongjagu) (41°19'47"N 127°05'02"E) in the county of Kimhyŏngjik in Ryanggang Province, a mountainous region, about 1,500 metres (4,900 ft) above sea level. The explosion was about 30 kilometres (19 mi) from the border with China. The area contains several military installations, including the Yeongjeo-dong ballistic missile base.

Early reports stated that seismic activity had been detected early on 9 September 2004, and this was correlated with a "strangely shaped cloud", suspected to be a mushroom cloud. Together these would indicate a large explosion. The date, 9 September 2004, the 56th anniversary of the formation of North Korea, was taken as significant because North Korea has a history of making grand military gestures on significant dates. However, the original reports have been contradicted by later reports denying that there was any explosion.

== Reaction ==
The incident was not reported internationally until 12 September 2004, when the South Korean news agency Yonhap cited a source in Beijing, China, which said a mushroom cloud had been observed. In addition, suspicion was raised by the fact that there was no mention of the explosion on internal North Korean media. However, North Korean news is usually a method employed by governing figures to make the ruling party's decisions more favourable to the people (national and internationally); therefore, unfavourable stories are commonly not broadcast. The Ryongchon disaster earlier in 2004 was reported only several days after the event.

There was immediate popular speculation that the explosion was nuclear in origin. United States Secretary of State Colin Powell said there was "no indication" that it was nuclear, and South Korea similarly said that it did not appear to be nuclear. It would be some days before the effects of a nuclear explosion would be unequivocally visible to apolitical authorities. It would not be possible to hide the nuclear nature of such an explosion for long, as the radioactive isotopes created by a nuclear explosion would be detectable to outside observers around the world.

=== From North Korea ===
North Korea initially denied that the explosion was nuclear. When prompted for an explanation, North Korea's foreign minister, Paek Nam-sun, officially stated that the explosion "was in fact the deliberate demolition of a mountain as part of a huge hydroelectric project". North Korea announced on 13 September 2004 that the British ambassador, David Slinn, would be permitted to visit the site. Diplomats from the United Kingdom, Sweden, Germany, the Czech Republic, Poland, Russia and Mongolia visited what was purported to be the site on 16 September 2004, and reported having seen a hydroelectric project under construction. However, South Korea said the diplomats had not been in the correct location and were about 100 km (62 mi) from the suspected explosion site.

=== From South Korea ===
On 17 September 2004, South Korean Vice Minister of Unification Rhee Bong-jo claimed that there was no explosion at all at the purported site, saying the supposed mushroom cloud was a natural cloud formation (mushroom clouds form from many types of large explosions, not only nuclear detonations). On the same day, the Korea Earthquake Research Center reported that the only seismic activity in Ryanggang province in the period in question was at 23:24 Korea Standard Time (UTC +9) on 8 September 2004 at Mount Baekdu, about 100 km from the suspected blast site.

== North Korean disarmament talks ==
At the time of the blast, North Korea was under pressure to again resume six-way diplomatic talks concerning its nuclear program with the United States, South Korea, China, Russia, and Japan. North Korea was insisting on a delay before a fourth round of talks, citing recently revealed South Korean nuclear research programs. On 14 September 2004, a British envoy said that North Korea was still committed to the talks, but on 27 September 2004, the KCNA, North Korea's state news agency, reported that resumption of the talks was out of the question until the United States made certain concessions.

Since the initial days, there has been essentially no follow-up reporting in Western media.

On 28 September, North Korean Vice Foreign Minister Choi Su-heon announced at the United Nations General Assembly that it had turned plutonium from 8,000 spent fuel rods into nuclear weapons as a deterrent against the US nuclear threat. Six-nation talks on the nuclear issue, which were due to resume, were instead suspended. As of this date, analysts believed North Korea had ruled out further talks until after the United States presidential election in November 2008.

Since then, North Korea has conducted multiple nuclear weapons tests and issued several threats of war on South Korea. As of April 2018, North Korea along with South Korea have announced their intentions to completely denuclearize the Korean peninsula and finally declare peace between the two Koreas.

== Cause ==
There has been a great deal of speculation on the nature of the incident. Hypotheses can be divided on several axes.

Things that could cause the physical phenomena observed:

- A large chemical explosive blast.
- A forest fire. The United States National Security Advisor, Condoleezza Rice, said "maybe it was ... some kind of forest fire". The Yonhap News Agency also quoted a source suggesting a forest fire.
- A natural cumulonimbus cloud formation.

If there was an explosion, the main possible causes:

- Explosive remnants of war. Unexploded ordnance from the Korean War become increasingly unstable as they deteriorate. The United States dropped 635,000 tons of bombs in Korea between 1950 and 1953.
- North Korea's official explanation of controlled demolition for a hydroelectric project.
- A nuclear weapon test or demonstration. Recent intelligence reported that North Korea might have been planning its first nuclear bomb test, and the significant date lends credence to this hypothesis. However, it would be unusual for North Korea to then deny it, and international officials have stated that it does not appear to have been a nuclear explosion. (Later updates in intelligence suggested that the test planning may have not been what it appeared to be.)
- A nuclear accident. Likewise, it has been denied that the explosion was nuclear.
- A large chemical explosive blast, to calibrate for a later nuclear test.
- Explosion of a munitions dump, or of explosives in a munitions factory.

Finally, another way to divide up explosion hypotheses is by how intentional it was:

- Intended by North Korea.
- Accidental. North Korea's failing economy has made its industry accident-prone, as seen in the Ryongchon disaster earlier in 2004.
- Covert operation by a foreign state.
- Military or terrorist action connected with an internal power struggle.

North Korea's claim to possess nuclear weapons on 10 February 2005 gives the nuclear testing or accident hypotheses some credibility. However, no neighboring nations have claimed any detection of radioactive isotopes which would be characteristic of either. North Korea claimed to have tested its first nuclear weapon on 9 October 2006. There have since been multiple nuclear tests by North Korea.

== See also ==
- North Korea and weapons of mass destruction
- Behind Enemy Lines II: Axis of Evil (direct-to-video action film based on the enemy action theory of the explosion.)
