= Léfini Faunal Reserve =

Protected area in the Republic of the Congo

Coordinates: 2°55′12″S 15°21′00″E

- IUCN category IV (habitat/species management area)
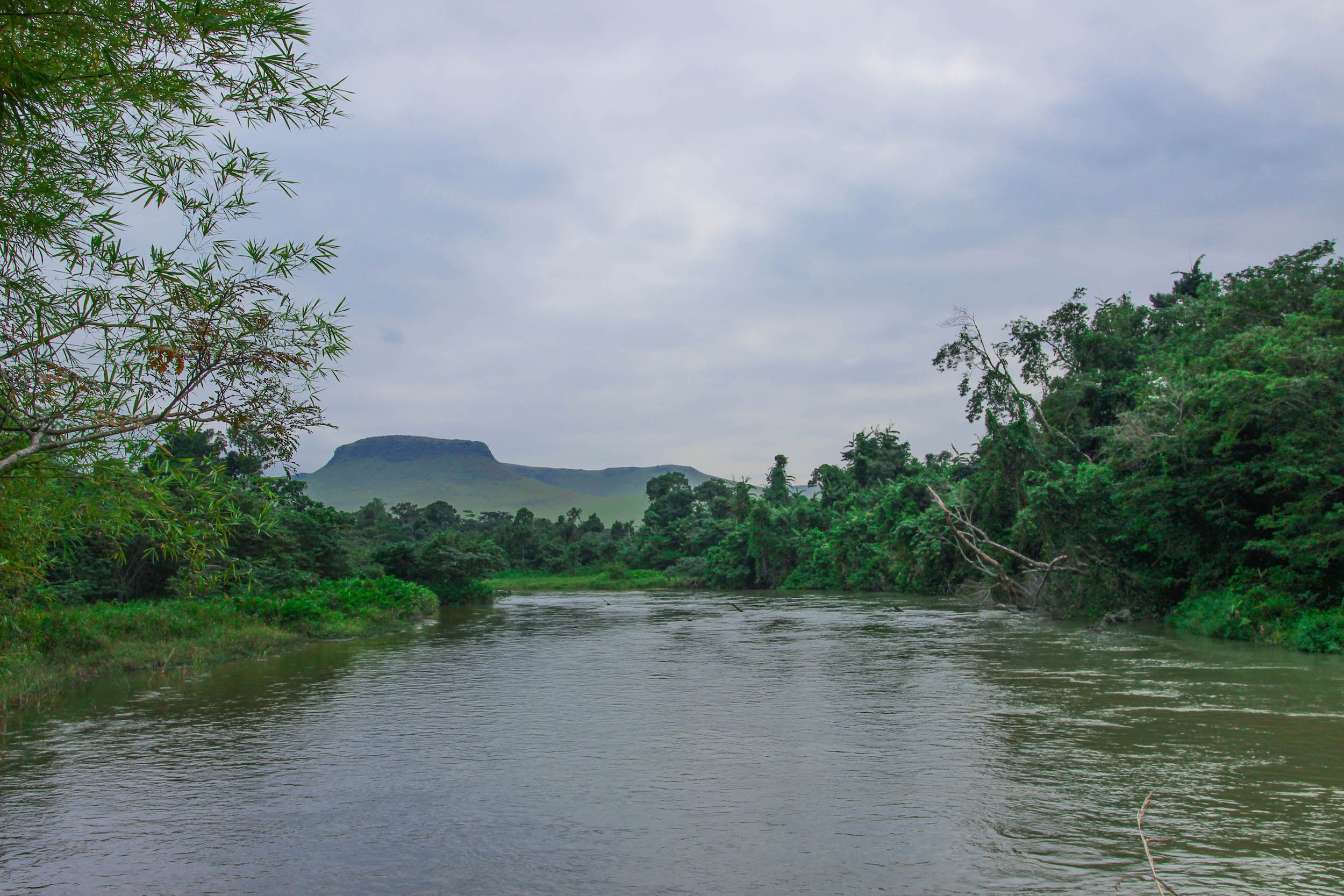
- Lefini landscape
- Location: Republic of the Congo
- Area: 6,300 km^{2} (2,400 sq mi)
- Established: 26 November 1951

The Léfini Faunal Reserve is a protected area in the south of the Republic of the Congo. It was established on 26 November 1951.

== Geography and environment ==
The reserve covers 6,300 km^{2} (2,400 sq mi). It lies on the Téké Plateau, which is characterised by an undulating grassy and forested landscape broken by limestone cliffs and rocky outcrops. There are extensive stretches of Loudetia simplex grassland and Hymenocardia acida wooded grassland. Local depressions in the landscape hold ponds and lakes. Much of the forest occurs as galleries and swamp forest along watercourses, with some patches of dry forest at higher elevations. Several small villages occur along roads in the area.

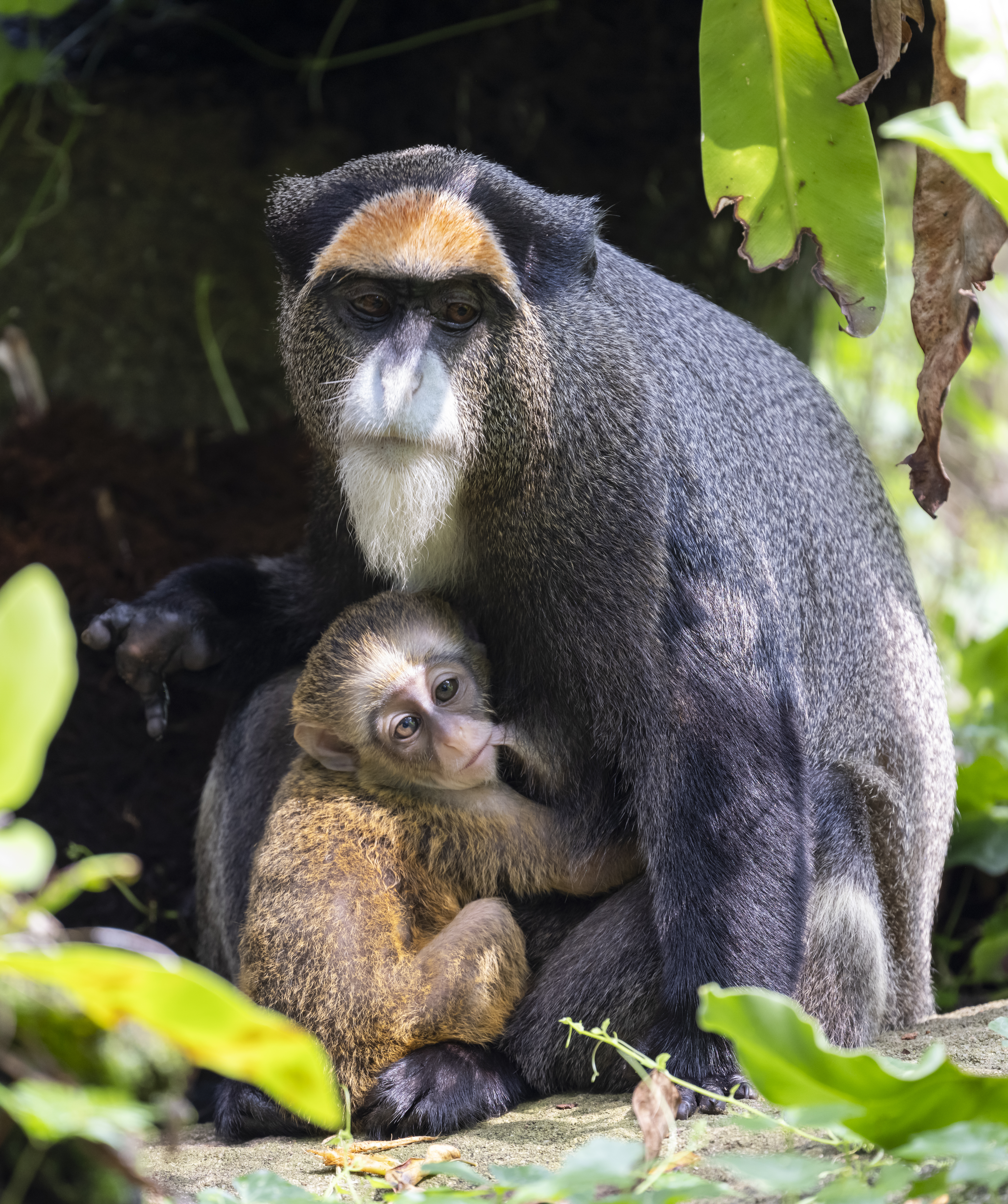
De Brazza's monkeys

=== Wildlife ===
The reserve has been designated an Important Bird Area (IBA) by BirdLife International because it supports significant populations of many bird species. Despite being overhunted in the past, large mammals still occurring in the reserve include African buffaloes, sitatungas, duikers and primates, including De Brazza's monkeys.
