= List of computer worms =

Name	Alias(es)	Type	Subtype	Isolation date	Origin	Author	Functions and notes
Badtrans	Badtrans.29020, Badtrans.B, Badtrans.A, I-Worm.BadtransII, Badtrans.gen	Mass mailer	Trojan	November 24, 2001	Poland	Unknown	Installed a keylogger; distributed logged information (such as passwords, usernames, etc.) to one of 22 emails.
Bagle	Beagle, Mitglieder, Lodeight, Trojan.DL.Bagle	Mass mailer	Trojan	January 18, 2004	Unknown	Unknown	Spread by email; certain variants had no subject and no text. Allowed attacker to access computers that were infected.
Blaster	Lovesan, MSBLAST	Mass DoS attacks	Logic bomb (payload set to activate August 15)	August 11, 2003	Hopkins, Minnesota	Jeffrey Lee Parson	Widespread DDoS attacks targeted Bill Gates; containing the message "billy gates why do you make this possible ? Stop making money and fix your software!!"[sic]. Caused over US$300,000,000 in damages, mostly to American infrastructure.
Brontok	W32.Rontokbro@mm, BackDoor.Generic.1138, Worm.Mytob.GH			October 3, 2005	Indonesia		Spread through an Indonesian e-mail headed with "stop the collapse in this country"; destroys firewalls.
BuluBebek	W32/VBWorm.QXE			October 10, 2008			
Code Red		DoS payload, Defacement payload		July 2001			Exploited Microsoft Internet Information Services to deface web pages and DOS a few set IPs.
Code Red II				August 4, 2001			Exploited Microsoft Internet Information Server security holes.
Conficker	Downup, Downadup, Kido			November 21, 2008			
Daprosy Worm	Worm.Win32.VB.arz, W32.Autorun.worm.h, W32/Autorun-AMS, Worm:Win32/Autorun.UD	Trojan	Mass mailer	July 15, 2009			Replaces folders with .EXE's, key logger, slow mass mailer.
Dabber	W32/Dabber-C, W32/Dabber.A			May 14, 2004			
Doomjuice				February 11, 2004			Attack computers that had previously been infected by the Mydoom worm.
ExploreZip	I-Worm.ZippedFiles			June 6, 1999			Spread through zipped documents in a spam e-mail.
Father Christmas	HI.COM			December 1988			
Hybris	Snow White, Full Moon, Vecna.22528			December 11, 2000	Brazil	Vecna	Spread through an e-mail from "haha@sexyfun.net".
ILOVEYOU	Loveletter, LoveBug	Worm		May 4, 2000	Manila, Philippines		
Kak worm				October 22, 1999			On the first day of any month, if the time was after 5 pm, Kak displayed a popup message box that read: "Driver Memory Error - Kagou-Anti-Kro$oft says not today !" Dismissing it would reboot the computer and then display the message again.
Klez				October 2001			
Koobface				December 2008			Targeted MySpace and Facebook users with a heading of "Happy Holidays".
Leap-A	Oompa-Loompa	Trojan worm		February 14, 2006			Most known for being the first virus targeting Mac computers.
Morris				November 2, 1988		Robert Tappan Morris	Widely considered to be the first computer worm. Although created for academic purposes, the negligence of the author unintentionally caused the worm to act as a denial of service attack. It spread by exploiting known vulnerabilities in UNIX-based systems, cracked weak passwords, and periodically altered its process ID to avoid detection by system operators.
Mydoom	W32.MyDoom@mm, Novarg, Mimail.R, Shimgapi			January 26, 2004			Fastest-spreading e-mail worm known; used to attack SCO Group
Mylife	W32.MyLife.C@mm	Mass mailer	Trojan (some variants)	April 2, 2002			Mass deletes files on infected computers. Certain variants show a caricature of U.S. President Bill Clinton.
Navidad	Emmanuel, W32.Wachit	Mass mailer	Trojan	December 1, 2000	South America	Unknown	Email appears to be in reply to someone the target has messages prior. Messages created by the virus are written entirely in Spanish.
Netsky				February 18, 2004	Germany	Sven Jaschan	
Nimda				September 2001			Originally suspected to be connected to Al Qaeda because of release date; uses multiple infection vectors.
Psyb0t	Network Bluepill			January 2009			
Sadmind				May 8, 2001			
Sasser	Big One			April 30, 2004		Sven Jaschan	Network worm. At startup, it kills the process lsass.exe, a windows process which handles file permissions. Killing lsass causes the computer to reboot one minute later, which would cause sasser to run again. This would continue in an infinite loop until the computer is shut down manually.
Sircam							Spread through e-mail with text like "I send you this file in order to have your advice."
Sober	CME-681, WORM_SOBER.AG			October 24, 2003	Germany, possibly from National Democratic Party of Germany		Was disguised as e-mail from United States government.
Sobig				August 2003			
SQL Slammer	DDOS.SQLP1434.A, the Sapphire Worm, SQL_HEL, W32/SQLSlammer						Caused global Internet slowdown.
Stuxnet	Win32/Stuxnet			June 2010			First malware to attack SCADA systems.
Swen				September 18, 2003			
Toxbot				2005	The Netherlands		Opened up a backdoor to allow command and control over the IRC network.
Upering	Annoyer.B, Sany			July 22, 2003			
Voyager	Voyager	Worm		October 31, 2005			Targets Operating System running Oracle Databases.
W32.Alcra.F	Win32/Alcan.I	Worm		February 17, 2006			Propagated through file-share networks.
W32/Bolgimo.worm							
W32/IRCbot.worm	W32/Checkout, W32.Mubla, W32/IRCBot-WB, and Backdoor.Win32.IRCBot.aaq	Trojan Worm	Backdoor	June 1, 2007			It provides a backdoor server and allows a remote intruder to gain access and control over the computer via an IRC channel.
WANK	OILZ			October 1989			Spread a pacifist, anti-nuclear political message.
Welchia	Nachia, Nachi						A helpful worm meant to install security patches and removes Blaster worm if the computer is infected by it.
Witty				March 19, 2004			Appeared very rapidly after announcement of Internet Security Systems vulnerability
Zotob						Farid Essebar and Atilla Ekici	

== See also ==
- Timeline of notable computer viruses and worms
- List of trojan horses
