= IDPS =

IDPS or IDPs may refer to:

- Intrusion detection and prevention system
- Internally displaced person
- International Dialogue on Peacebuilding and Statebuilding
