= Protocol-based intrusion detection system =

A protocol-based intrusion detection system (PIDS) is an intrusion detection system which is typically installed on a web server, and is used in the monitoring and analysis of the protocol in use by the computing system. A PIDS will monitor the dynamic behavior and state of the protocol and will typically consist of a system or agent that would typically sit at the front end of a server, monitoring and analyzing the communication between a connected device and the system it is protecting.

A typical use for a PIDS would be at the front end of a web server monitoring the HTTP (or HTTPS) stream. Because it understands the HTTP relative to the web server/system it is trying to protect it can offer greater protection than less in-depth techniques such as filtering by IP address or port number alone, however this greater protection comes at the cost of increased computing on the web server.

Where HTTPS is in use then this system would need to reside in the "shim" or interface between where HTTPS is un-encrypted and immediately prior to it entering the Web presentation layer.

== Monitoring dynamic behavior ==
At a basic level a PIDS would look for, and enforce, the correct use of the protocol.

At a more advanced level the PIDS can learn or be taught acceptable constructs of the protocol, and thus better detect anomalous behavior.

== See also ==
- Application protocol-based intrusion detection system (APIDS)
- Host-based intrusion detection system (HIDS)
- Intrusion detection system (IDS)
- Network intrusion detection system (NIDS)
- Tripwire (software) – a pioneering HIDS
- Trusted Computing Group
- Trusted platform module
