= Martin Roesch =

American computer security developer and business leader

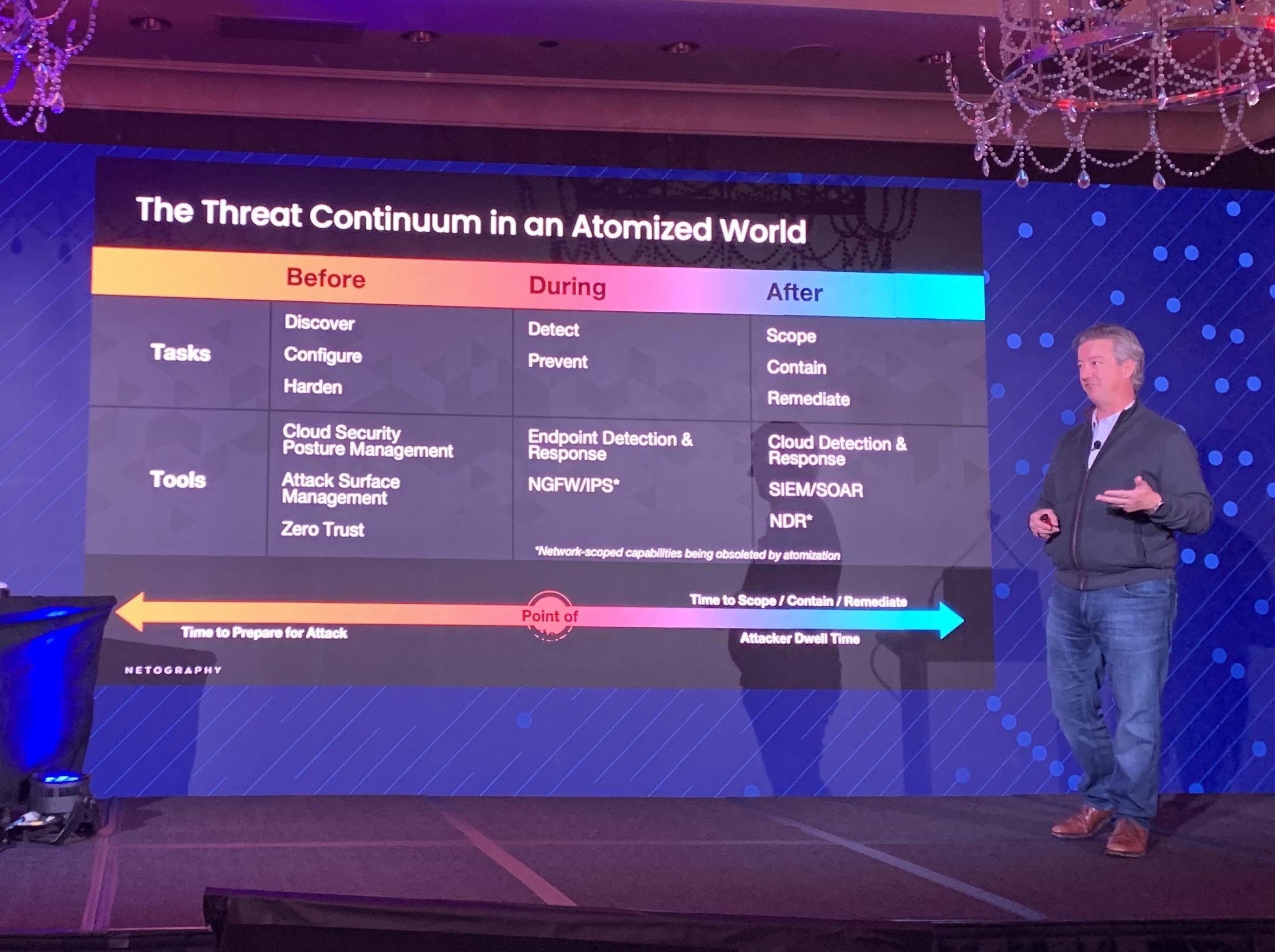
Roesch in 2022

Martin is the original author and lead developer of the Snort Intrusion Detection and Prevention System, a pioneering Open Source Software project released in 1998 that rapidly became the global standard for network-based attack definition and detection.

In January 2001, Roesch founded a company he named Sourcefire that used Snort as the foundation for the Sourcefire Next Generation Firewall and IDS/IPS systems. He was the CEO from inception until May 2002, then CTO until June 2012, when he returned to the CEO role until the company was acquired by Cisco Systems on October 7, 2013 for $2.7B.

He served as the Chief Architect of the Security Business Group at Cisco until February 2019, leading efforts around security strategy, architecture, and acquisitions.

After a hiatus, Roesch returned to startups, joining Netography as its CEO in August 2021. He led the company through its $45M Series A in November 2021 and remained CEO until Netography was acquired by Vectra AI in 2025.
