= Comm100 =

Software company in Canada

- Company type: Private
- Industry: E-Commerce, Software
- Founded: 2009
- Headquarters: Vancouver, Canada
- Area served: Worldwide
- Products: Live Support Software, Email Marketing Software, Web Help Desk
- Website: comm100.com

Comm100 (Comm100 Network Corporation) is a provider of customer service and communication products. All its products are available as a SaaS (Software as a Service). The company serves over 200,000 businesses.

== History ==
The company was founded on 3 July 2009, in Vancouver, British Columbia, Canada. The first product (Comm100 Live Chat) was introduced on 5 August 2009. The company reached the 100,000 registered business users milestone in April 2011. The company's products and services were offered for free until the Christmas of 2011. In May 2013, the company joined M3AAWG as a supporter.

== Products and services ==
The company provides a suite of business communication tools, from customer service to marketing. The two most popular products are:

Comm100 Live Chat: live support software that allows users to track and chat with their website visitors in real time.

Comm100 Email Marketing: bulk email software that helps users send opt-in email newsletters to subscribers.
