= Hubris (disambiguation) =

Hubris is extreme or excessive pride or dangerous overconfidence and complacency.

Hubris may also refer to:

== Books ==
- Hubris (Haslam book), 2024 book by Jonathan Haslam about American foreign policy and the Russian invasion of Ukraine
- Hubris (Isikoff and Corn book), 2006 book by Michael Isikoff and David Corn about the Iraq War

== Music albums ==
- Hubris (Oren Ambarchi album), 2016
- Hubris (Richard Beirach album), 1978
- Hubris I & II, a 2009 album by Andreas Kisser

== Other uses ==
- Hubris (mythology), personification of insolence in Greek mythology
- Hubris (TV series), 2017 Burmese drama television series

== See also ==
- Hybris (disambiguation)
