= Matthias Scherz =

German former professional footballer (born 1971)

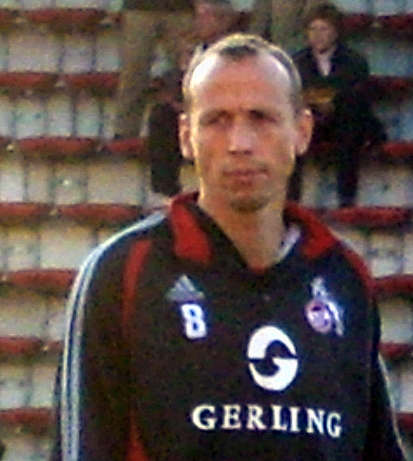
- Scherz with 1. FC Köln in 2006

Personal information
- Date of birth: 14 December 1971 (age 54)
- Place of birth: Rotenburg (Wümme), West Germany
- Height: 1.86 m (6 ft 1 in)
- Position: Striker

Youth career
- 1979–1989: SV Rot-Weiß Scheeßel

Senior career*
Years	Team	Apps	(Gls)
1989–1994	SV Rot-Weiß Scheeßel		
1994–1996	FC St. Pauli II	63	(13)
1996–1999	FC St. Pauli	86	(12)
1999–2009	1. FC Köln	265	(64)
2012–2013	Fortuna Köln	1	(0)
- * Club domestic league appearances and goals

Matthias Scherz (born 14 December 1971) is a German former professional footballer who played as a striker.

== Career ==
Scherz was born in Rotenburg an der Wümme, Lower Saxony. He played for the amateur club Rot-Weiß Scheeßel until 1994. Then, at the age of 22, he joined FC St. Pauli. In his first two years in Hamburg, he was member of their amateur team. During the 1996–97 season he reached his goal to play in a first squad in the Bundesliga. After the club was relegated to the 2. Bundesliga, he appeared in the starting eleven most of the time.

In 1999, he went to the second league club 1. FC Köln where he also had a place in the first team. In the 2002–03 season, he scored 18 times - three times more than usual in his previous seasons and helped his club to gain promotion to the first league.

The following season he could not repeat his previous seasons performance, and 1. FC Köln was again relegated. In the 2003–04 season, he netted 11 goals, second on the team to Lukas Podolski, in a season that saw FC Köln once again gain promotion.

Although he has not played as often in the last few years, he did score seven times in 13 games during the 2007–08 second league season with FC Köln. He retired from football in 2009, but returned three years later to sign for Fortuna Köln of the Regionalliga West. He retired again in 2013.
