= Rotenburg an der Wümme =

Rotenburg (Wümme)
- Town
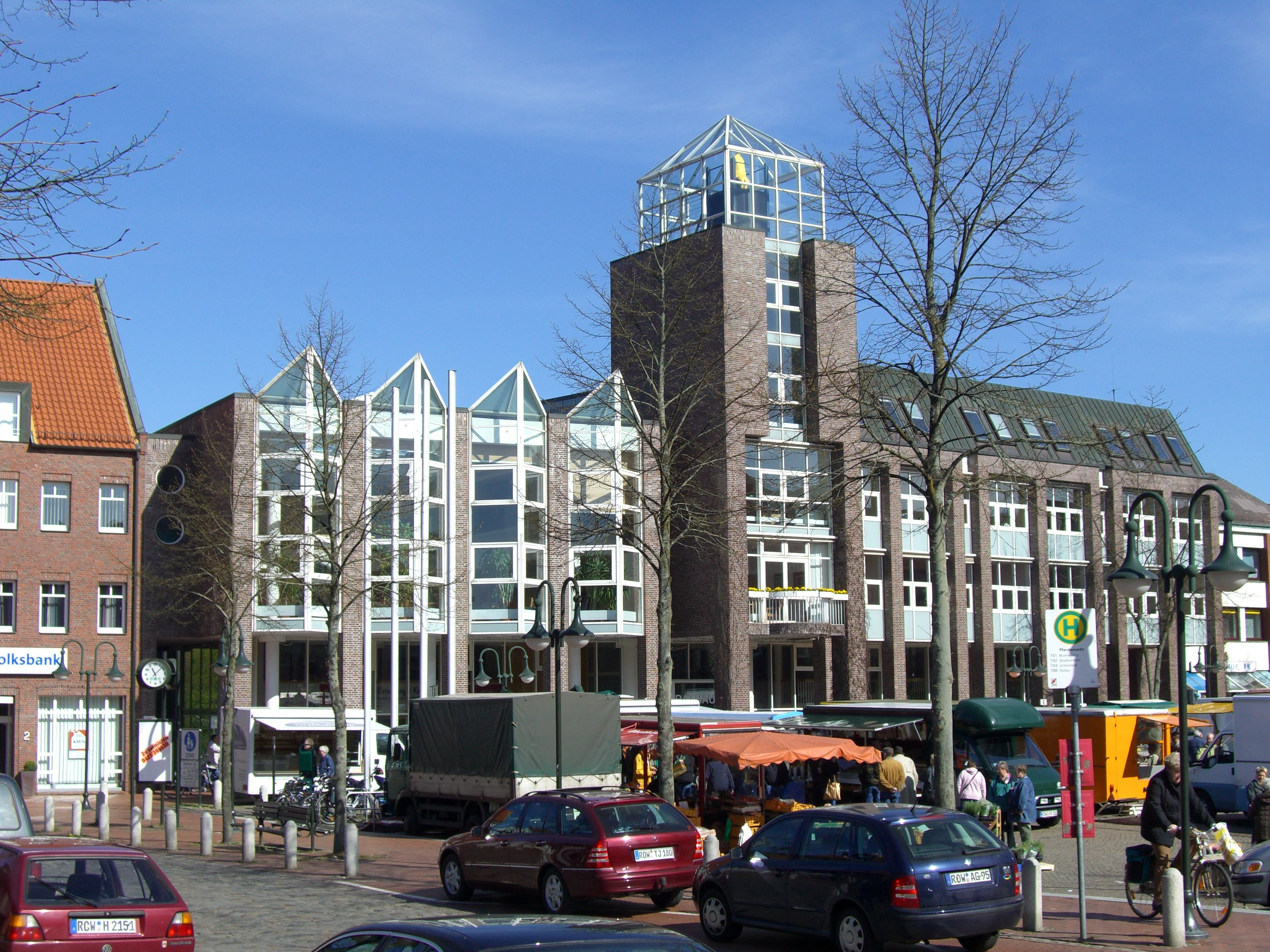
- Town hall

- Coat of arms

- Location of Rotenburg (Wümme) within Rotenburg (Wümme) district
- Interactive map of Rotenburg (Wümme)
- Location within Germany Location within Lower Saxony
- Coordinates: 53°06′25″N 09°23′49″E
- Country: Germany
- State: Lower Saxony
- District: Rotenburg (Wümme)
- Founded: 1195
- Subdivisions: 5 districts

Government
  - Mayor (2026–2034): Stefan Fuchs (Alliance 90/The Greens)

Area
  - Total: 99.06 km^{2} (38.25 sq mi)
- Elevation: 30 m (98 ft)

Population (2025-12-31)
  - Total: 23,211
  - Density: 234.3/km^{2} (606.9/sq mi)
- Time zone: UTC+01:00 (CET)
  - Summer (DST): UTC+02:00 (CEST)
- Postal codes: 27356
- Dialling codes: 04261
- Vehicle registration: ROW
- Website: www.rotenburg-wuemme.de

Rotenburg (Wümme) (German pronunciation: [ˈʁoːtn̩bʊʁk]; also Rotenburg an der Wümme; Rotenburg in Hannover until May 1969; Northern Low Saxon: Rodenborg) is a town in Lower Saxony, Germany and capital of the district of Rotenburg.

== Geography ==
Rotenburg is situated on the Wümme river, which lies between the rivers Elbe and Weser at about the same latitude as Hamburg and Bremen, the latter lying 40 km to the west. It is often called "Rotenburg (Wümme)" in order to distinguish it from Rotenburg an der Fulda in Hesse and Rothenburg ob der Tauber in Bavaria.

== History ==
The town was founded in 1195, when Prince-Bishop Rudolf I of Verden built a castle in the area. The town then belonged to the Prince-Bishopric of Verden which was established in 1180. The castle took its name from the colour of the bricks (rot means "red", Burg "castle"). The adjoining settlement remained a tiny village until the 19th century.

In 1648 the Prince-Bishopric was transformed into the Principality of Verden, which was first ruled in personal union by the Swedish Crown, interrupted by Danish occupation from 1712 to 1715. From then on it was ruled by the Hanoverian Crown.

=== Swedish period ===
After the Thirty Years' War, the rule of the Bishops of Verden ended and Rotenburg became part of the secularised Duchy of Verden under Swedish rule. In this period its new rulers built the castle with the remnants of the Schloss into a modern fortress as an outpost to protect the main fortress at Stade. This rebuilding work required the western part of the town to be demolished, making it necessary to move the main area of settlement to the east. Even the parish church had to be taken down and moved to the site of the present town church.

In the Swedish-Brandenburg War from 1675 to 1676 the town was captured during a military campaign by an alliance of Denmark and several states of the Holy Roman Empire, and it remained in Allied hands until the end of the war in 1679. In the wake of the Treaty of Saint Germain in 1679 Rotenburg was returned to Sweden.

The fortress remained in operation until roughly 1680. After that it was neglected, the building being torn down and only the fortifications being modernised in places. After 1843 the last ramparts were levelled. In its place today is the terrain of the old local history museum. In the period between 1626 and 1835 there were seven town fires, which destroyed a significant part of the town's infrastructure. Swedish rule lasted until the town was captured by Denmark in 1712.

=== Affiliation with Hanover, Prussia, and the German Empire ===
In 1715, Rotenburg, along with the entire Duchy of Verden, was acquired by purchase by the Electorate of Brunswick-Lüneburg. During the Napoleonic Wars, the region around Rotenburg formed the Canton of Rotenburg, part of the Arrondissement of Bremen within the Imperial French Department of the Bouches-du-Weser. Following the Congress of Vienna in 1814, the former Electorate of Brunswick-Lüneburg was re-established as the Kingdom of Hanover. Here, Rotenburg formed the center of the Office of Rotenburg within the Landdrostei of Stade. This structure is still recognizable today in the boundaries of various institutions, such as the Stade Chamber of Commerce and Industry (IHK Stade) or the Stade Regional Association (Landschaftsverband Stade). Following the annexation of Hanover by Prussia in 1866, Rotenburg lay within the Province of Hanover, which is why the town was given the designation "Rotenburg in Hanover." During this period, the railway station on the Bremen–Hamburg railway line was built, opening in 1874. In 1880, the Rotenburger Werke der Inneren Mission were founded by Adolf Kottmeier as facilities for people with intellectual disabilities, and they continue to exist today. In 1905, the Evangelical Lutheran Bethesda Deaconess Motherhouse, founded by Elise Averdieck, relocated its headquarters from Hamburg to Rotenburg. This move was associated with the construction of a hospital (today's Diakonie Hospital) and the assumption of care for the residents of the Rotenburger Werke. In 1929, Flecken of Rotenburg was granted city rights.

=== Later history ===
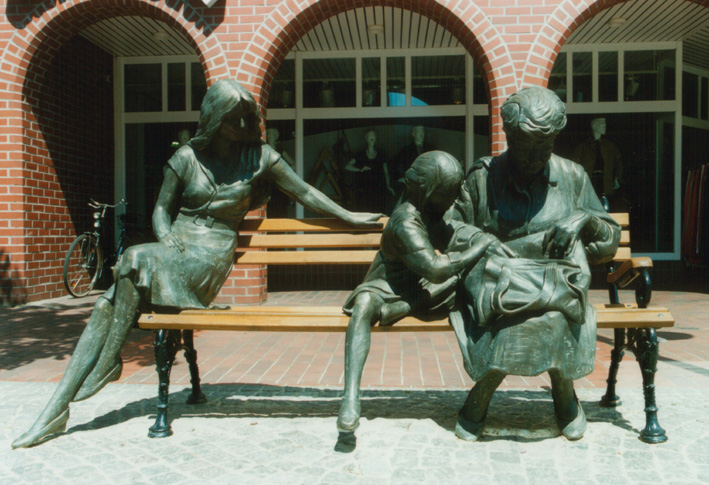
Cast in bronze by Carsten Eggers: Drei Generationen (Three generations); centre of Wümme

The Kingdom of Hanover incorporated the principality in a real union; the princely territory, including Rotenburg upon Wümme, became part of the new Stade Region, established in 1823. In 1866, Prussia annexed the territory from Hannover. As a result, Rotenburg was renamed Rotenburg in Hannover. In May 1969, the town and district authorities changed the name to "Rotenburg an der Wümme". In 2006, during the World Cup, Rotenburg hosted the national team from Trinidad and Tobago.

== Mayor ==
The mayor of Rotenburg (Wümme) is Stefan Fuchs (Alliance 90/The Greens), who was elected with 52.26% of the vote on 27 September 2026. First time ever since, he will keep the position for an eight year term instead of five years until now.

== Sights ==
- The Lutheran Stadtkirche (built between 1860 and 1862, with a baptismal font from the 16th century and a bell from the 14th century)
- The War Memorial 1914/18, in memory of those from Rotenburg who fell in World War I
- Half-timbered houses in Goethestraße and Große Straße.
- The Heimatmuseum (museum of local history)
- The Paar-oh-die Fountain in the Neuer Markt

== Education ==
- Kantor-Helmke-Schule (primary school)
- Schule am Grafel (primary school)
- Stadtschule (primary school)
- Theodor-Heuss-Schule (Orientierungstufe)
- Realschule
- Pestalozzischule (Sonderschule)
- Ratsgymnasium
- Berufsbildende Schule (vocational school)
- Fachschule für Sozialpädagogik (Diakonissenmutterhaus)
- Fachschule für Heilerziehungspflege (Health education nursing)
- Kinderkrankenpflegeschule (children's nursing)
- Lindenschule (conducive school for spiritual development)
- Krankenpflegeschule (Nursing)
- Kreismusikschule (music school)
- Montessori-Grundschule
- Volkshochschule

== Twinning ==
- Aalter, Belgium
- Czerwieńsk (German: Rothenburg an der Oder), Poland
- Falmouth, Cornwall, United Kingdom
- Rotenburg an der Fulda, Hesse, Germany
- Rothenburg, Lucerne, Switzerland
- Rothenburg ob der Tauber, Bavaria, Germany
- Rothenburg, Oberlausitz, Saxony, Germany
- Rothenburg, Saxony-Anhalt, Germany

== Notable people ==
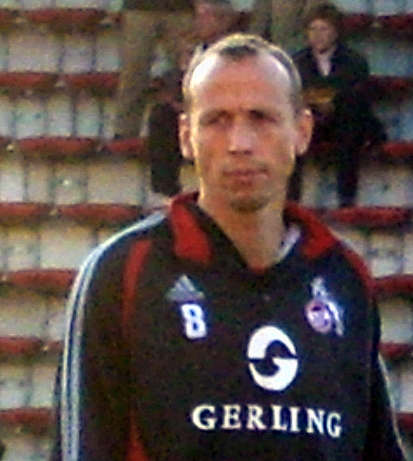
Matthias Scherz, 2006

- Hartwig Hohnsbein (born 1937), political scientist, retired pastor, author, born in Rotenburg an der Wümme.
- Heinz Dieterich (born 1943), sociologist and political analyst, lives in Mexico.
- Sven Jaschan (born 1986), creator of the Sasser computer worm.

=== Sport ===
- Matthias Scherz (born 1971), footballer, played over 410 games
- Ahmet Kuru (born 1982), Turkish footballer, played 323 games
- Dimitri Peters (born 1984), judoka, bronze medallist at the 2012 Summer Olympics
- Philip Zwiener (born 1985), basketball national player
