= Friedrich Wilhelm Fritzsche =

Wilhelm Fritzsche (1825-1905), a founder of the German Cigarmakers Union.

Friedrich Wilhelm Fritzsche (March 25, 1825 – February 5, 1905), commonly known by his middle name, was a German trade unionist and socialist politician who was elected a member of the Reichstag. He was a founder and President of the General German Cigar Workers' Union (ADZV) in 1865. The subject of police persecution for his political views, in 1881 Fritzsche emigrated to the United States of America, where he edited the newspaper the Philadelphia Tageblatt for a time before retiring from politics.

== Biography ==
=== Early years ===
Friedrich Wilhelm Fritzsche, known to his family and friends as Wilhelm, was born in Leipzig, in the Kingdom of Saxony, one of the German States, on March 25, 1825. His father, Wilhelm Fritzsche, was a journeyman shoemaker.

Fritzsche was forced to work from an early age, taking his first job as a cigarmaker in 1840 at the age of 15.

=== Political career ===
Fritzsche became politically active late in the 1840s.

In 1849 Fritzsche was arrested for his participation in the 1848 Revolution in the city of Dresden.

Fritzsche was a founding member of the Leipzig Educational Association in February 1861 and together with Julius Vahlteich split away from that group the following year to form a new workers' organization called Vorwärts (Forward). With the establishment of the General German Workers' Association (ADAV) in May 1863, Fritzche became a founding member of that organization and was elected to the organization's governing Executive Committee. He would become Vice President of the ADAV in 1865 and briefly served as President of that organization in November 1865.

The November 30, 1865 General Meeting of the ADAV voted a motion of no confidence in Fritzsche's leadership and he returned to Leipzig, resigning both his Vice Presidency and his position as the organization's official representative in that city.

Fritzsche subsequently turned his attention to trade union organization, serving as one of the principals establishing the General German Cigar Workers' Union (ADZV), of which he was President from 1865 until 1878. Fritzche also became a newspaper editor for the first time in this period, producing the weekly paper of the union, Der Botschafter, from 1866 until its ban by the authorities in 1879.

In July 1868 Fritzsche was elected to the North German regional Reichstag.

Disagreement with the leadership of Johann Baptist von Schweitzer led him to leave the ADAV in the summer of 1869. While Fritzsche was a delegate to the founding congress of the Social Democratic Workers' Party of Germany (SDAP) in August 1869, he does not seem to have been a member of the new organization, instead rejoining the ADAV in 1872. Whatever his misgivings about membership in the SDAP, Fritzsche emerged as a leading voice in favor of unity of the two organizations, and he was selected as a delegate to the Unity Congress held at Gotha.

The Gotha Congress resulted in the formation of the Socialist Workers' Party of Germany (SAPD), forerunner of the modern Social-Democratic Party of Germany.

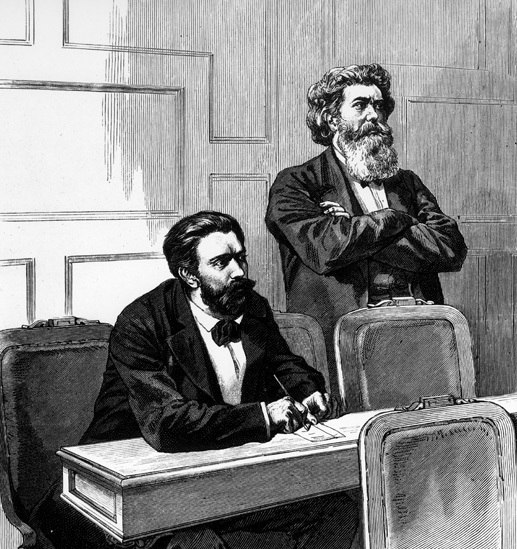
August Bebel (seated) and Friedrich Wilhelm Fritzsche during Otto von Bismarck's speech on the Socialist Law in the German Reichstag (woodcut based on a drawing by Georg Koch)

In 1877 and 1878, Fritzche was elected a member of the Reichstag on the ticket of the Socialist Workers' Party, in which he remained a member until his emigration to America in 1881. Frizsche found himself expelled from Berlin in 1879 after passage of the Anti-Socialist Laws. He returned to Leipzig and established a new newspaper there called Der Wanderer (The Wanderer). He was dispatched to London and America for the first time in 1880, where he spoke on behalf of the Socialist Workers' Party, attempting to build international support for the German socialist movement.

=== Newspaper editor in America ===
Harassed constantly by the authorities, Fritzche emigrated to America in 1881, settling in the city of Philadelphia, Pennsylvania, where he edited the labor newspaper the Philadelphia Tageblatt (Philadelphia Daily News).

=== Later years and death ===
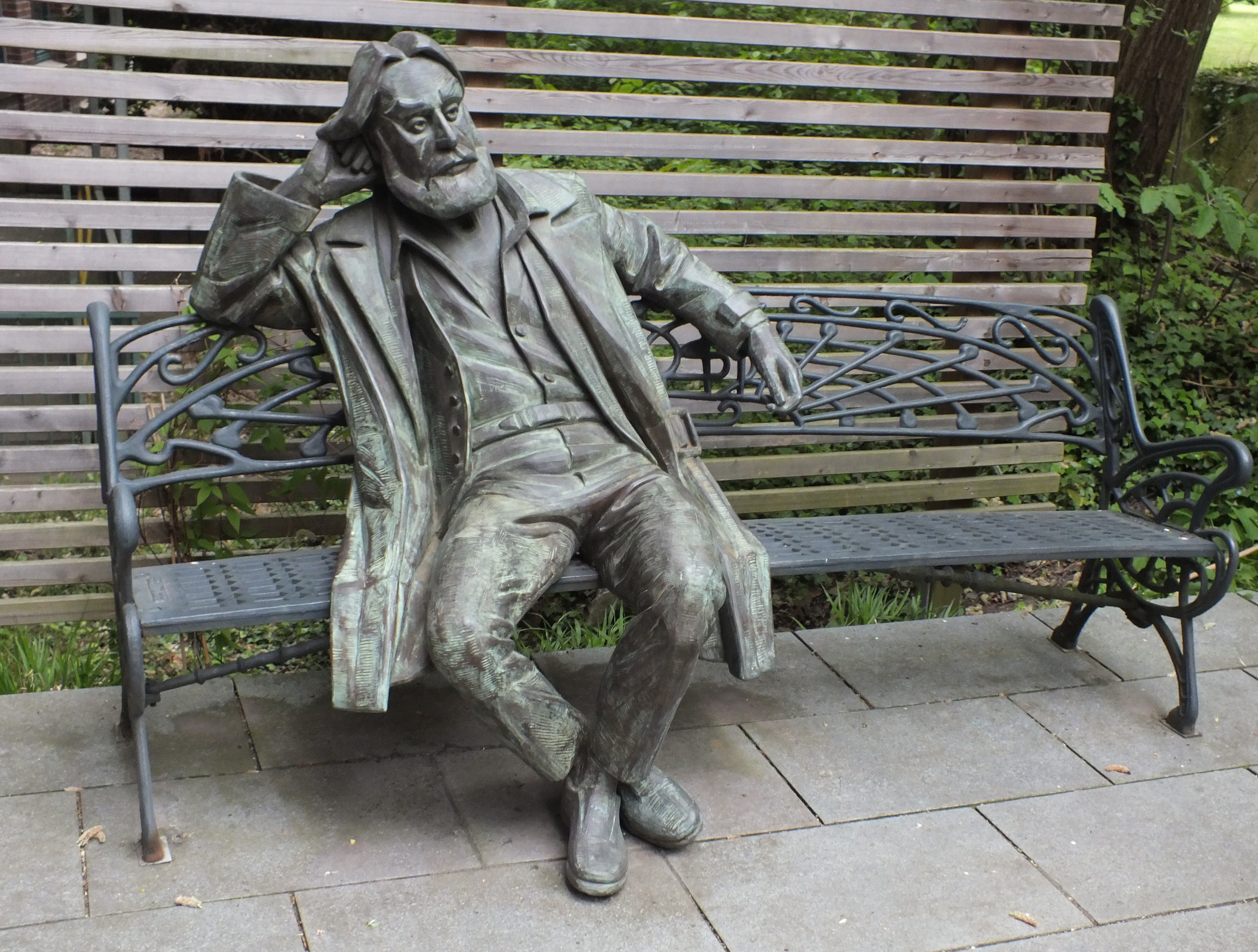
Friedrich Wilhelm Fritzsche bronze sculpture by Carsten Eggers in the courtyard of the headquarters of the NGG trade union

After his time editing the Tageblatt, Fritzsche retired from politics to life as an innkeeper in Philadelphia.

Fritzsche died in Philadelphia on February 5, 1905, aged 79.

== Works ==
- Die sociale Selbsthülfe nach der Lehre Ferdinand Lassalle's : ein Beitrag zur Klärung der öffentlichen Meinung (Social Self-Assistance According to the Teachings of Ferdinand Lassalle: A Contribution to the Clarification of Public Opinion). Leipzig: self-published, n.d. [c. 1867].
