= Hybris =

Hybris may refer to:

- Hybris or hubris, exaggerated self pride
- Hybris (mythology), in Greek mythology, the personification of insolence
- 430 Hybris, a typical Main belt asteroid

== Computing ==
- hybris (company), a software products company
- Hybris (video game), a 1987 computer video game
- Hybris (software), a compatibility layer for Linux
- Hybris (computer worm), an e-mail worm

== Music ==
- Hybris (record label), an independent record label
- Hybris (album), an album by Änglagård
