= Comm100 Live Chat =

Live support software

- Developer(s): Comm100
- Initial release: August 5, 2009
- Operating system: Cross-platform
- Type: Live support software, e-commerce, web analytics
- License: Proprietary (SaaS)
- Website: www.comm100.com/livechat

Comm100 Live Chat is an online web chat software offered via the SaaS (Software as a service) business model. It is used by companies to centrally manage inquiries and support for customers on various platforms, utilizing live chat and AI-assisted responses to interact with the end-user.

== History ==
The first version of Comm100 Live Chat was released on August 5, 2009. In October 2011, Comm100 Live Chat was featured in Apps of the Month on TechRepublic by Scott Lowe. The company had 200,000 registered business users in October, 2012. In January 2013, Comm100 Live Chat released version 7.0 which features Salesforce integration and a redesigned operator console. In the same month, Comm100 Live Chat was ranked top 3 in the "2013 Best Enterprise Chat Software" category on Top Ten Reviews. During the March 2013 upgrade of the live chat software, zero downtime was made available.

== Malware infection ==
In 2022, the Comm100 Live Chat installer was compromised due to a supply chain attack on Comm100. The software was bundled with a backdoor within its JavaScript code file which allowed for arbitrary code execution by the attacker. Due to the software being signed using a valid digital signature, the vulnerability was not detected by antivirus software.

The malware was active from approximately September 27 until September 29, when the malicious code was removed in a subsequent update. It is presumed that the attack originated from China, as comments written with Chinese characters were found within the code.

== Features ==
Comm100 Live Chat consists of three features, a web chat window, an operator console and a control panel. They include a web-based version that works with different web browsers (Chrome, IE, Firefox, Safari, Opera, etc.) on different operating systems (Windows, Mac, Linux) while the operator console has a cross-platform compatible desktop app and apps for mobile devices (iPhone, iPad, Android, and BlackBerry).

Key features of Comm100 Live Chat include:

- Online chat: The website visitor and the operator can have an online chat in real time.
- Website Traffic Monitoring: The operator can see detailed information about the website visitors, including GEO info, navigation history, referrer, etc.
- Auto Chat Invitation Rules: Automated chat invitations can be sent to visitors in a personal way based on predefined rules.
- Reports & Analytics: A series of performance reports are available for users to identify areas for improvement.

== Integrations ==
Comm100 Live Chat offers plugins or integrations with the following:

- Customer relationship management software: Salesforce.com
- Content management systems: WordPress, Joomla, Drupal
- E-commerce platforms: Shopify, Magento
- Help desk solutions: Zendesk
- Web analytics tools: Google Analytics
