= Rotenburger Werke =

The Rotenburger Werke der Inneren Mission in Rotenburg (Wümme) is to provide facilities and services to help people with disabilities—physical, mental or emotional—by offering residential housing, education, job training, aid with medical problems such as diagnostics and therapy. They believe that being able to work gives daily structure and meaning to one's life, and part of their mission is to allow even those with the most severe disabilities to be able to do so.

== Job Training ==
Job training and work are an essential part of the organization. They offer job training programs for adults and adolescents.

Under the umbrella of the Rotenburger Werke, there are several establishments in which people can work and that also provide necessary services to the community. These include:

- Kitchen and bakery
- Housekeeping
- Laundry facilities
- Joinery
- Industrial work
- Horticulture
- Bicycle workshop
- Products of the Day Fund
- Textile center
- Car service

The goal of these workshops is to teach participants the necessary skills for them to find a job in the wider world. The workshops currently have 330 job spaces and 25 spaces for vocational training.

== Residential Programs ==
In its residential facilities, Rotenburger Werke aims to help its residents lead meaningful lives and meet their basic needs. They believe this involves "the need for security and security, recognition and appreciation; the need for contacts, partnership, tenderness and sexuality; the desire for stability and familiarity; [and] the need for religious and / or ideological development." They vary the form of housing based on each individual's needs and lifestyle, such as their physical abilities, whether or not they have a partner, and how much independence they desire.

Since 2011, they have also offer residential programs for children in Rotenburg, where they live in one of three family style communities. The center works with their parents and families to ensure they have the best chance to succeed as adults.

== Locations ==
The facilities of the Rotenburger Werke offer stationary places and ambulatory help in several places in northern Lower Saxony:

- Rotenburg
- Unterstedt
- Scheeßel
- Falkenburg
- Visselhövede
- Harsefeld
- Zeven
- Soltau

The main administration is located in Lindenstraße 14 in Rotenburg.

== History ==
In 1877, a member of the community suffered an accident due to their epilepsy. This opened the eyes of the local church to the challenges of living with epilepsy. A year later, the association was founded "for the care of epileptics" and they bought a small house in 1880 and inaugurated Superintendent Adolf Kottmeier as founder and first leader. In 1897, 150 people were already living in the institution. In 1905 the deaconesses of the Mother House Bethesda moved from Hamburg to Rotenburg and took over the care of the now 330 inhabitants.

In the 1930s under the direction of the pastor Johannes Buhrfeind, a new program began in 1931 which included "erudition and heredity" (eugenics), "physique and character" and "the problem of the abbreviation of life-unwanted life" (euthanasia). While a systematic application of these concepts before the Third Reich has not yet been investigated in detail, it is documented that in the following years 800 people of the then-called Rotenburger Anstalten institution were removed by the Nazi regime and 547 of them were demonstrably murdered. The Rotenburg institutions and their then director Pastor Buhrfeind did not resist. Individual fates, e.g. the then 11-year-old Eckhard Willumeit were reconstructed.

In 1949 the Rotenburger Anstalten were again given a self-administration. From 1966 to 1970, new houses were built and in 1972 a technical school for healers' training was established. On 17 April 1996 the General Assembly adopted a new statute and a new name: "Rotenburger Werke der Inneren Mission."
