= Real-time adaptive security =

Network security model

Real-time Adaptive Security is the network security model necessary to accommodate the emergence of multiple perimeters and moving parts on the network, and increasingly advanced threats targeting enterprises. Adaptive security can watch a network for malicious traffic and behavioral anomalies, ferret out end point vulnerabilities, identify real-time changes to systems, automatically enforce end point protections and access rules, block malicious traffic, follow a compliance dashboard while providing audit data, and more.

Among the key features of an adaptive security infrastructure are security platforms that share and correlate information rather than point solutions, so the heuristics system could communicate its suspicions to the firewall. Other features include finer-grained controls, automation (in addition to human intervention), on-demand security services, security as a service, and integration of security and management data. Rather than adding security to custom applications after they go operational, security models would be created at the design phase of an app.

A major change with this model of real-time adaptive security is shifting authorization management and policy to an on-demand service that contains details and policy enforcement that matches compliance and can adapt to the user's situation when he or she is trying to access an application, for instance.

== Dependence on Machine Learning ==
The factual importance in getting adapted to changing network for any real time adaptive scenario cannot overlook the possibilities of machine learning. It is all about the behaviour of users over network. Adaptive authentication depends on machine learning to model a baseline over time of mannerism of normal users. Recent advents in machine learning offers a brighter prospect in artificial intelligence integration to real time adaptation. Unique risk score is figured out, which will define and decide of possibilities of security issues thereby ensuring escalated protection along with stopless user accessibility.

== See also ==
- Intrusion-detection system
- Network intrusion detection system
- Sourcefire
- IBM Internet Security Systems
- Machine Learning
- Risk-based Authentication
