= Vectra AI =

AI cyber security company

- Formerly: TraceVector; Vectra Networks
- Type: Privately held
- Industry: Cybersecurity; Network security Cloud security
- Founded: 2011; 15 years ago
- Founders: Mark Abene, James Harlacher, Marc Rogers, Ivan Wick
- Headquarters: San Jose, California, U.S.
- Number of locations: 11 offices; 3 Security Operations Centers (2023)
- Area served: North America, Europe, Middle East, Africa, Australia/New Zealand, Japan and Asia-Pacific
- Key people: Hitesh Sheth (CEO); Oliver Tavakoli (CTO)
- Products: Vectra AI Cybersecurity Platform (formerly Cognito Platform), Vectra Detect, Vectra Recall, Vectra Stream
- Services: MDR (Managed security service)
- Number of employees: 580
- Website: www.vectra.ai

Vectra AI, Inc. is a cybersecurity company that uses AI for hybrid attack detection, investigation, and response (NDR) solutions. The company was established in 2011 and operates in 113 countries from its San Jose, California headquarters, with further locations in Singapore, Australia, and Japan.

== History ==
Vectra AI, formerly known as TraceVector, was founded in 2008 by a group of 4 cybersecurity professionals. Its mission was to offer security professionals an automated intrusion detection system that could address the escalating and sophisticated cyber-attacks which had increased dramatically in recent years.

In March 2015, Vectra launched the S-series sensor, announced record bookings growth of nearly 400 percent in 2015 over 2014 and expanded its business into EMEA.

On January 25, 2022, Vectra AI completed the acquisition of Siriux, a network management software company.

In 2023, the company partnered with Curtiss-Wright’s Defense Solutions Division to support cyber stacks used in National Security operations.

In October 2025, Vectra AI acquired cloud security firm Netography to enhance multi-cloud visibility via scalable SaaS analysis of flow and DNS logs across Amazon Web Services, Google Cloud Platform, Azure, and OCI

The company's current CEO is Hitesh Sheth.

== Product ==
Vectra AI automates threat detection. The Vectra AI Platform with Attack Signal Intelligence uses AI to analyze the behavior of attackers and automatically apply triage. These threats are then correlated, and each security incident is prioritized. The platform employs the integrated signal powering Extended Detection and Response (XDR). XDR is designed to help with threat detection and response challenges in real-time. In 2023 Vectra announced an update to their Cloud Detection and Response for Amazon Web Services.

== Funding ==
Vectra AI raised a total of $350 million in funding and is considered a Unicorn with its $1.2 billion valuation.
