= Alarm filtering =

Concept in IT network management

Alarm filtering, in the context of IT network management, is the method by which an alarm system reports the origin of a system failure, rather than a list of systems failed.

== Example ==
Depending on the way a network is set up, the failure of one device (be it software or hardware) may cause a device dependent on that first device to fail. In this situation, a non-filtering alarm system will report both the original failure and the failure of the dependent device. With alarm filtering, the alarm system is able to report the original failure with more priority than the subsequent failure, allowing a technician or repairman to concentrate on the cause of the issue, rather than wasting time trying to repair the wrong device.
