= Anton Chuvakin =

Computer security specialist

Anton Chuvakin is a computer security specialist, currently at Google Cloud Office of the CISO. He was formerly a Research VP at Gartner for Technical Professionals (GTP) Security and Risk Management Strategies (SRMS) team. Formerly he was a principal at Security Warrior Consulting. Previous positions included roles of a Director of PCI Compliance Solutions at Qualys, a U.S. Vulnerability management company, a Chief Logging Evangelist with LogLogic, a U.S. Log Management and Intelligence company and a Security Strategist with netForensics, a U.S. Security information management company.

Anton is the co-host of the Cloud Security Podcast by Google. His podcasting work covers topics in Cloud Security ranging from operations, to detection, to governance.

A physicist by education (M.S. Moscow State University, Ph.D. State University of New York at Stony Brook), he is an author of many publications and invited talks on computer and network security and a co-author of "Security Warrior" published in 2004 by O'Reilly (ISBN 0-596-00545-8) and later translated and published in German, Polish and Japanese. His other books include "PCI Compliance" republished in 2009 (second edition) by Syngress Publishing (ISBN 9781597494991) and "Logging and Log Management: The Authoritative Guide to Understanding the Concepts Surrounding Logging and Log Management" published in 2012 by Syngress Publishing (ISBN 9781597496353).

Anton's contributions to information security are focused on log management and PCI DSS compliance.

== See also ==
- Computer security
- Computer insecurity
- Reverse engineering
