= Yongguang Zhang =

Yongguang Zhang from Microsoft Research Asia, China was named Fellow of the Institute of Electrical and Electronics Engineers (IEEE) in 2014 for contributions to software radio technology. He received his Ph.D. in computer science from Purdue University in 1994. From 2001 to 2003, served as an adjunct assistant professor of computer science at the University of Texas at Austin. He is an associate editor for IEEE Transactions on Mobile Computing, an area editor for MC2R, was a guest editor for the ACM MONET Journal.
