= Hybris (computer worm) =

Computer worm

Malware details
- Technical name: W95/Hybris-mm
- Aliases: Snow White, Hahaha
- Type: Mass mailer
- Subtype: Win32 worm
- Classification: Computer worm
- Family: Hybris
- Isolation date: September 2001
- Origin: Brazil
- Author: Vecna

Hybris (also known as Snow White, Vecna.22528, and Full Moon) is a computer worm believed to have been written by Brazilian virus writer Vecna, member of the computer virus writing group 29A. It first appeared in September 2000 and became more common in January 2001.

Hybris typically comes from an email that appears to be from "hahaha" email ID with a malicious attachment. When executed, the worm modifies WSOCK32.DLL so that when the victim sends an email to someone from the infected machine, a secpond email is sent with the malicious executable. Malicious "plug-ins" enhanced Hybris's functionality to include various other e-mail types. Other plugin functionalities include a spinning "wheel of hypnosis."

The name Hybris originates from the text within the virus: "HYBRIS" "(c) Vecna".
