= Alcra (computer worm) =

Computer worm

W32.Alcra. F is a computer worm that is spread by P2P file sharing networks. It is regarded as a low-risk virus, and is usually detected by a virus scan.

== Effects ==
The W32.Alcra. F worm saves a number of empty files and links to a computer, and then attempts to connect to those links thus causing an error.

== Detection and removal ==
A full system scan usually can find, and remove this worm without much difficulty.
