= Sasser (computer worm) =

2004 computer worm

Malware details
- Technical name: Win32/Sasser (Microsoft); Worm:Win32/Sasser.[Letter] (Microsoft); Net-Worm:W32/Sasser (F-Secure); Net-Worm:W32/Sasser.[Letter] (F-secure); W32.Sasser.Worm (Symantec); W32.Sasser.[Letter] (Symantec); W32.Sasser.[Letter].Worm (Symantec); W32/Sasser-[Letter] (Sophos); Worm.Win32.Sasser.[letter] (Sophos); W32.Sasser.Worm (Sophos); W32/Sasser.worm.[letter] (Sophos); WORM_SASSER (Trend Micro); WORM_SASSER.[Letter] (Trend Micro); BAT_SASSER.[Letter] (Trend Micro)
- Type: Worm
- Author: Sven Jaschan

Technical details
- Platforms: Windows 2000, Windows XP

Sasser is a computer worm that affects computers running vulnerable versions of the Windows XP and Windows 2000 operating systems. Sasser spreads by exploiting the system through a vulnerable port and can spread without user intervention. It is stopped by a properly configured firewall or by downloading system updates from Windows Update. The specific hole Sasser exploits was documented and patched by Microsoft prior to the release of the worm.

The most characteristic experience of the worm is the shutdown timer that appears due to the worm crashing LSASS. Sasser impacted various organizations including Agence France-Presse (AFP) having all its satellite communications blocked for hours and the U.S. flight company Delta Air Lines having to cancel several trans-Atlantic flights.

== History ==
The Sasser computer worm was created on April 29, 2004. The LSASS vulnerability was patched by Microsoft in the April 2004 installment of its monthly security packages, prior to the release of the worm.

== Behavior ==
The specific hole Sasser exploits is documented by Microsoft in its MS04-011 bulletin (CVE-2003-0533). Sasser spreads by exploiting the system through a vulnerable port. Thus, it is particularly virulent in that it can spread without user intervention, but it is also easily stopped by a properly configured firewall or by downloading system updates from Windows Update.

The worm was named Sasser because it spreads by exploiting a buffer overflow in the component known as LSASS (Local Security Authority Subsystem Service) on the affected operating systems (vulnerable versions of the Microsoft operating systems Windows XP and Windows 2000). This buffer overflow gives a long string to an undocumented API in Microsoft Active Directory-related functions, which both allows for arbitrary code execution and often crashes LSASS.exe.

Once on a machine, the worm scans different ranges of IP addresses and connects to victims' computers primarily through TCP port 445. If a vulnerable installation of Microsoft's Windows XP and Windows 2000 is found, the worm utilizes its own FTP server hosted on previously infected machines to download itself onto the newly compromised host. Microsoft's analysis of the worm indicates that it may also spread through port 139. Several variants called Sasser.B, Sasser.C, and Sasser.D appeared within days (with the original named Sasser.A).

=== Side effects ===
An indication of the worm's infection of a given PC is the existence of the files C:\win.log, C:\win2.log or C:\WINDOWS\avserve2.exe on the PC's hard disk, the ftp.exe running randomly and 100% CPU usage, as well as seemingly random crashes with LSA Shell (Export Version) caused by faulty code used in the worm.

The most characteristic symptom of the worm is the shutdown timer that appears due to the worm crashing LSASS.exe.

=== Mitigation ===
The specific hole Sasser exploits is documented by Microsoft in its MS04-011 bulletin (CVE-2003-0533), for which a patch had been released seventeen days earlier. It is easily stopped by a properly configured firewall or by downloading system updates from Windows Update.

== Impact ==
The impact of Sasser included the news agency Agence France-Presse (AFP) having all its satellite communications blocked for hours and the U.S. flight company Delta Air Lines having to cancel several trans-Atlantic flights because its computer systems had been swamped by the worm. The Nordic insurance company If and their Finnish owners Sampo Bank came to a complete halt and had to close their 130 offices in Finland. The British Coastguard had its electronic mapping service disabled for a few hours, and Goldman Sachs, Deutsche Post, and the European Commission also had issues with the worm. The X-ray department at Lund University Hospital had all their four layer X-ray machines disabled for several hours and had to redirect emergency X-ray patients to a nearby hospital.

Some technology specialists speculated that the worm writer reverse-engineered the patch to discover the vulnerability, which would open millions of computers whose operating system had not been upgraded with the security update.

== Author ==
On 7 May 2004, an 18-year-old German named Sven Jaschan from Rotenburg, Lower Saxony, then student at a technical college, was arrested for writing the worm. German authorities were led to Jaschan partly because of information obtained in response to a bounty offer by Microsoft of US$250,000.

One of Jaschan's friends had informed Microsoft that his friend had created the worm. He further revealed that not only Sasser, but also Netsky.AC, a variant of the Netsky worm, was his creation. Another variation of Sasser, Sasser.E, was found to be circulating shortly after the arrest. It was the only variation that attempted to remove other worms from the infected computer, much in the way Netsky does.

Jaschan was tried as a minor because the German courts determined that he created the worm before he was 18. The worm itself had been released on his 18th birthday (29 April 2004). Sven Jaschan was found guilty of computer sabotage and illegally altering data. On Friday, 8 July 2005, he received a 21-month suspended sentence.

== See also ==
- Blaster (computer worm)
- Nachia (computer worm)
- BlueKeep (security vulnerability)
- Timeline of notable computer viruses and worms
