= Toxbot =

Toxbot (a.k.a. Codbot) is a computer worm that targeted Microsoft Windows XP, Windows 2000, and Windows Server 2003 and was primarily active in 2005. On infected computers, it opened up a backdoor to allow command and control over the IRC network, thus creating a botnet that at its peak comprised about 1.5 million computers. The two unidentified makers of the botnet were arrested in October 2005 and received jail sentences of 24 and 18 months and fines from a Dutch court.
