= Upering =

Computer worm

Malware details
- Technical name: W32/Upering.A
- Aliases: Annoyer.B, Sany
- Type: Mass-mailer
- Subtype: Win32 worm
- Classification: Computer worm
- Family: N/A
- Isolation date: July 22, 2003
- Origin: Woonsocket, Rhode Island, United States
- Author: kuZuper

Upering (alias "Annoyer.B", or "Sany") is a mass-mailing computer worm. It was isolated in Tacoma, Washington, in the United States, from several submissions from America Online members. As of late 2005, it is listed on the WildList, and has been since 2003.
