= Application protocol-based intrusion detection system =

An application protocol-based intrusion detection system (APIDS) is an intrusion detection system that focuses its monitoring and analysis on a specific application protocol or protocols in use by the computing system.

== Overview ==
An APIDS will monitor the dynamic behavior and state of the protocol and will typically consist of a system or agent that would typically sit between a process, or group of servers, monitoring and analyzing the application protocol between two connected devices.

A typical place for an APIDS would be between a web server and the database management system, monitoring the SQL protocol specific to the middleware/business logic as it interacts with the database.

== Monitoring dynamic behavior ==
At a basic level an APIDS would look for, and enforce, the correct (legal) use of the protocol.

However at a more advanced level the APIDS can learn, be taught or even reduce what is often an infinite protocol set, to an acceptable understanding of the subset of that application protocol that is used by the application being monitored/protected.

Thus, an APIDS, correctly configured, will allow an application to be "fingerprinted", thus should that application be subverted or changed, so will the fingerprint change.

== See also ==
- Intrusion detection system (IDS)
- Web application firewall (WAF)
