= Netsky (computer worm) =

Family of malware programs

Malware details
- Type: Computer worm
- Origin: February 2004
- Author: Sven Jaschan

Technical details
- Platform: Microsoft Windows

Netsky is a prolific family of computer worms that affect Microsoft Windows operating systems. The first variant appeared on Monday, February 16, 2004. The "B" variant was the first family member to find its way into mass distribution. It appeared on Wednesday, February 18, 2004. 18-year-old Sven Jaschan of Germany confessed to having written these and other worms, such as Sasser.

Although individual functions vary widely among viruses, the Netsky family is perhaps most famous for comments contained within the code of its variants insulting the authors of the Bagle and Mydoom worm families and, in some cases, routines that removed versions of these viruses. The "war", as it was referred to in the media, caused a steady increase in the number of variant viruses produced in these families. As of June 2004, Bagle had approximately 28, Netsky approximately 29, and MyDoom approximately 10.

Other symptoms of Netsky included beeping sounds on specified dates, usually in the morning hours.

The worm was sent out as an e-mail, enticing recipients to open an attachment. Once opened, the attached program would scan the computer for e-mail addresses and e-mail itself to all the addresses found.

Until October 2006, the P variant of this virus remained the most prevalent virus being sent in e-mail throughout the world, despite being over two and a half years old. It was surpassed by a variant from the Stration malware family in November 2006.

== See also ==
- Timeline of notable computer viruses and worms
