= Welchia =

2003 computer worm

Malware details
- Alias: Nachi worm
- Type: Computer worm
- Origin: 2003

Technical details
- Platform: Microsoft Windows

Welchia, also known as the "Nachi worm", is a computer worm that exploits a vulnerability in the Microsoft remote procedure call (RPC) service similar to the Blaster worm. However, unlike Blaster, it first searches for and deletes Blaster if it exists, then tries to download and install security patches from Microsoft that would prevent further infection by Blaster, so it is classified as a helpful worm. Welchia was successful in deleting Blaster, but Microsoft claimed that it was not always successful in applying their security patch.

This worm infected systems by exploiting vulnerabilities in Microsoft Windows system code (TFTPD.EXE and TCP on ports 666–765, and a buffer overflow of the RPC on port 135). Its method of infection is to create a remote shell and instruct the system to download the worm using TFTP.EXE. Specifically, the Welchia worm targeted machines running Windows XP. The worm used ICMP, and in some instances flooded networks with enough ICMP traffic to cause problems.

Once on the system, the worm patches the vulnerability it used to gain access (thereby actually securing the system against other attempts to exploit the same method of intrusion) and run its payload, a series of Microsoft patches. It then attempts to remove the Blaster Worm by deleting MSBLAST.EXE. If still in the system, the worm is programmed to self-remove on January 1, 2004, or after 120 days of processing, whichever comes first.

In September 2003, the worm was discovered on the US State Department's computer network, causing them to shut down their network for 9 hours for remediation.

== See also ==
- Blaster (computer worm) – 2003 Windows computer worm
- Grey hat – Hacker who operates without permission or malice
- Helpful worm
- Sasser (computer worm) – 2004 computer worm
- Timeline of notable computer viruses and worms – Computer malware timeline
- White hat (computer security) – Computer hacker who hacks ethically
