= ExploreZip =

Computer worm

ExploreZip (also known as I-Worm.ZippedFiles) is a destructive computer worm that attacks machines running Microsoft Windows. It was first discovered in Israel on June 6, 1999. The worm contains a malicious payload, and utilizes Microsoft Outlook, Outlook Express, or Exchange to mail itself out by replying to unread messages in the user's inbox. The worm also searches mapped drives and networked computers for Windows installations. If found, it copies itself to the Windows folder of the remote computer and then modifies the Win.ini file of the infected computer. On January 8, 2003, Symantec discovered a packed variant of this threat which exhibits the same characteristics.

== Distribution ==
The worm is distributed in the form of an e-mail with the words:

Hi !

I have received your email and I shall send you a reply ASAP.

Till then, take a look at the attached zipped docs.

bye

== Payload ==
The message includes an attachment with the name ZIPPED_FILES.EXE. If opened, a dialog box appears in Windows resembling the one normally appearing when opening a corrupted Zip archive, while the worm copies itself onto the machine's hard drive. It also modifies the WIN.INI file (Windows 9x) or the Windows Registry (Windows NT) so that it re-executes on reboot.

The worm looks for a copy of Microsoft Outlook to mail itself to all other people in the user's address book. It then destroys Microsoft Office documents, C, C++, and assembly language source files on the user's hard drive by overwriting them with zero-byte files.
