= Zotob =

Computer worm

Zotob was a 2005 computer worm that exploited security vulnerabilities such as the MS05-039 plug-and-play vulnerability in Microsoft operating systems. The worm has been known to spread on Microsoft-ds or TCP port 445. Farid Essebar and Atilla Ekici were arrested for writing and distributing the worm.

Microsoft employed 50 investigators and offered a $250,000 reward for the capture of the hackers. Microsoft's General counsel noted on 26 August 2005 that "The fact that we were able to see these arrests in less than two weeks and see them halfway around the world really drives that point home." The Zotob worms cost an average of $97,000 as well as 80 hours of cleanup per company affected. According to Business Week, the Zotob worm and its variations infected computers at companies such as ABC, CNN, The Associated Press, The New York Times, and Caterpillar Inc.

== Rbot variant ==
Zotob was derived from the Rbot worm, which can force an infected computer to continuously restart. Its outbreak on August 16, 2005, was covered "live" on CNN television, as the network's own computers became infected. Zotob would self-replicate each time the computer rebooted, resulting in each computer having numerous copies of the file by the time it was purged.

== Sequence of events ==
- August 9, 2005: Security advisory
  "On August 9th, Microsoft released critical security advisory MS05-039 which revealed a vulnerability in the Plug-and-Play component of Windows 2000. Code to patch the loophole was also made available."
- Virus writing
  "In the days since Microsoft's announcement, virus writers have released several variants of both Zotob and RBot, along with updated versions of older worms named SD-Bot and IRC-Bot, designed to take advantage of the newly discovered flaw."
- August 13, 2005: Emerged on Saturday
  "The worms, called Zotob and Rbot, and variants of them, started emerging Saturday, computer security specialists said, and continued to propagate as corporate networks came to life at the beginning of the week."
- August 16, 2005: Took down CNN live
  "Around 5 p.m. problems began at CNN facilities in New York and Atlanta before being cleared up about 90 minutes later."
  "CNN, breaking into regular programming, reported on air that personal computers running Windows 2000 at the cable news network were affected by a worm that caused them to restart repeatedly."
  "The Internet Storm Center, which tracks the worldwide impact of computer worms, indicated on its Web site that no major Internet attack was underway. Likely this is an isolated event, which became newsworthy because CNN got infected. We do not see any new threats at this point, the site read."
- August 17, 2005: CIBC and other banks, companies affected
  "CIBC says the Zotob worm caused some isolated outages, but did not affect ATMs, Internet or phone banking. The virus also hit other Canadian businesses but has not caused widespread shutdowns."
- August 26, 2005: A suspect is arrested in Morocco
  "Under the request of the FBI, Moroccan police arrests 18-year-old Farid Essebar, a Moroccan, suspected for being behind the spread of the virus."
- September 16, 2006: Sentencing
  "The creators of the Zotob Windows worm Farid Essabar and his friend Achraf Bahloul were sentenced by a court in Morocco.

== Arrest of the coders ==
On August 26, 2005, Farid Essebar and Atilla Ekici were arrested in Morocco and Turkey, respectively. They are believed to be the men behind the worm's coding.

A signature in the Zotob worm code suggested it was coded by Diabl0 and the IRC server it connects to is the same used in previous version of Mytob. Diabl0 is believed to have incorporated the code of a Russian nicknamed houseofdabus whose journal has been shut down by authorities, just after the arrest of Diabl0. The coder (Ekici) probably paid Diabl0 (Essebar) to write the code.

"He says it's all about making money, and that he doesn't care if people remove the worm because it's the spyware stuff that he installs that's making him the money, Taylor said in a conversation with me."

On August 30, 2005, controversial reports emerged from different anti-virus firms. Sophos declared that several people had access to the Mytob source code (a variant of the worm). On the other hand, F-Secure declared that it has found multiple variants of Mytob that were coded after the arrest of Essebar. Those declarations suggest that Essebar is only a part of a larger group of Dark-side hackers behind the spread of the malware.

== Farid Essebar ==
Farid Essebar (Arabic: فريد الصبار) (born in 1987, known as Diabl0) is a Moroccan black hat hacker. He was one of the two people behind the spread of Zotob. Essebar is also a Russian citizen.

It is believed that his intention was to facilitate credit card forgery scams. The FBI believes that Atilla Ekici paid Essebar to code the worm. In July 2006, investigators stated that Essebar may have authored more than 20 viruses.

On 15 September 2006 a Moroccan court sentenced Essebar to two years of prison. It was reduced to a year on 15 December 2006.

On 17 March 2014, Essebar was arrested in Thailand after a 2-year investigation by Thai police. The investigation was triggered by a complaint from Swiss authorities over an alleged infiltration of a Swiss bank that caused dozens of billions of dollars' damage.

== See also ==
- Timeline of notable computer viruses and worms

== External links and sources ==
=== Security vulnerability information ===
- Microsoft Security Bulletin MS05-039 (Microsoft)
- Microsoft Security Advisory (899588) (Microsoft)
- US Cert Vulnerability Note VU#998653 (US-CERT)
- Secunia Advisory SA16372 (Secunia)
- CAN-2005-1983 (Common Vulnerabilities and Exposures)
- Bugtraq ID 14513 (SecurityFocus)

=== Worm information ===
- What You Should Know About Zotob (Microsoft)
- W32.Zotob Removal Tool (Symantec Security Response)
- WORM_ZOTOB.D (Trend Micro)
- Zotob.A (F-Secure)
- Zotob.C (F-Secure)
- WORM_RBOT.CBR (Trend Micro)
- Full Timeline (Security Blogger)
- Zotob Removal Instructions

=== News coverage ===
- BBC News Windows 2000 worm hits US firms
- BBC News Windows 2000 bug starts virus war
- BBC News Two detained for US computer worm
- BBC News Money motive drove virus suspects
- New York Times Virus Attacks Windows Computers at Companies
- CNN Worm strikes down Windows 2000 systems
- MSNBC Computer worms strike media outlets
- Reuters Computer virus hits U.S media outlets
- Slashdot Zotob Worm Hits CNN and Goes Global
- Information Week Zotob Proves Patching "Window" Non-Existent
- Security Now! PodCast - Episode #1: "As the Worm Turns"
