= Blaster (computer worm) =

2003 Windows computer worm

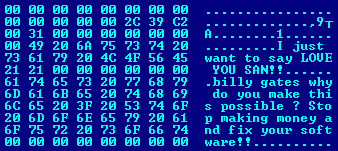
- Hex dump of the Blaster worm, showing a message left for Microsoft founder Bill Gates by the programmer

Malware details
- Technical name: As Blaster: Worm.Win32.Blaster (Global Hauri); W32/Blaster (Norman); W32/Blaster (Sophos); W32.Blaster.Worm (Symantec); As Lovsan: Lovsan (F-secure); W32/Lovsan.worm (McAfee); As MSBLAST: Worm.Win32.Blaster (Global Hauri); Win32/Msblast (Microsoft); WORM_MSBLAST (Trend Micro); Win32.Poza (CA) Blaster (Panda)
- Aliases: Lovsan, Lovesan, MSBlast
- Type: Worm
- Isolation date: 2003
- Origin: Hopkins, Minnesota (B variant only)
- Author: Jeffrey Lee Parson (B variant only)

Technical details
- Platforms: Windows XP and Windows 2000
- Ports used: Remote Procedure Call

Blaster (also known as Lovsan, Lovesan, or MSBlast) was a computer worm that spread on computers running operating systems Windows XP and Windows 2000 during August 2003.

The worm was first noticed and started spreading on August 11, 2003. The rate that it spread increased until the number of infections peaked on August 13, 2003. Once a network (such as a company or university) was infected, it spread more quickly within the network because firewalls typically did not prevent internal machines from using a certain port. Filtering by ISPs and widespread publicity about the worm curbed the spread of Blaster.

In September 2003, Jeffrey Lee Parson, an 18-year-old from Hopkins, Minnesota, was indicted for creating the B variant of the Blaster worm; he admitted responsibility and was sentenced to an 18-month prison term in January 2005. The author of the original A variant remains unknown.

== Creation and effects ==
According to court papers, the original Blaster was created after security researchers from the Chinese group Xfocus reverse engineered the original Microsoft patch that allowed for execution of the attack.

The worm spreads by exploiting a buffer overflow discovered by the Polish security research group Last Stage of Delirium in the DCOM RPC service on the affected operating systems, for which a patch had been released one month earlier in MS03-026 (CVE-2003-0352) and later in MS03-039. This allowed the worm to spread without users opening attachments simply by spamming itself to large numbers of random IP addresses. Four versions have been detected in the wild. These are the most well-known exploits of the original flaw in RPC, but there were in fact another 12 different vulnerabilities that did not see as much media attention.

The worm was programmed to start a SYN flood against port 80 of windowsupdate.com if the system date is after August 15 and before December 31 and after the 15th day of other months, thereby creating a distributed denial of service attack (DDoS) against the site. The damage to Microsoft was minimal as the site targeted was windowsupdate.com, rather than windowsupdate.microsoft.com, to which the former was redirected. Microsoft temporarily shut down the targeted site to minimize potential effects from the worm.

The worm's executable, MSBlast.exe, contains two messages. The first reads:

I just want to say LOVE YOU SAN!!

This message gave the worm the alternative name of Lovesan. The second reads:

billy gates why do you make this possible ? Stop making money
and fix your software!!

This is a message to Bill Gates, the co-founder of Microsoft and the target of the worm.

The worm also creates the following registry entry so that it is launched every time Windows starts:

HKEY_LOCAL_MACHINE\SOFTWARE\Microsoft\Windows\CurrentVersion\Run\ windows auto update=msblast.exe

== Timeline ==
- May 28, 2003: Microsoft releases a patch that would protect users from an exploit in WebDAV that Welchia used. (Welchia used the same exploit as MSBlast but had an additional method of propagation that was fixed in this patch. This method was only used after 200,000 RPC DCOM attacks - the form that MSBlast used.)
- July 5, 2003: Timestamp for the patch that Microsoft releases on the 16th.
- July 16, 2003: Microsoft releases a patch that would protect users from the yet unknown MSBlast. At the same time they also released a bulletin describing the vulnerability.
- Around July 16, 2003: White hat hackers create proof-of-concept code verifying that the unpatched systems are vulnerable. The code was not released.
- July 17, 2003: CERT/CC releases a warning and suggests blocking port 135.
- July 21, 2003: CERT/CC suggests also blocking ports 139 and 445.
- July 25, 2003: xFocus releases information on how to exploit the RPC bug that Microsoft released the July 16 patch to fix.
- August 1, 2003: The U.S. issues an alert to be on the lookout for malware exploiting the RPC bug.
- Sometime prior to August 11, 2003: Other viruses using the RPC exploit exist.
- August 11, 2003: Original version of the worm appears on the Internet.
- August 11, 2003: Symantec Antivirus releases a rapid release protection update.
- August 11, 2003, evening: Antivirus and security firms issued alerts to run Windows Update.
- August 12, 2003: The number of infected systems is reported at 30,000.
- August 13, 2003: Two new worms appear and begin to spread. (Sophos, a variant of MSBlast and W32/RpcSpybot-A, a totally new worm that used the same exploit)
- August 15, 2003: The number of infected systems is reported at 423,000.
- August 16, 2003: DDoS attack against windowsupdate.com starts. (Largely unsuccessful because that URL is merely a redirect to the real site, windowsupdate.microsoft.com.)
- August 18, 2003: Microsoft issues an alert regarding MSBlast and its variants.
- August 18, 2003: The related helpful worm, Welchia, appears on the internet.
- August 19, 2003: Symantec upgrades their risk assessment of Welchia to "high" (category 4).
- August 25, 2003: McAfee lowers their risk assessment to "Medium".
- August 27, 2003: A potential DDoS attack against HP is discovered in one variant of the worm.
- January 1, 2004: Welchia deletes itself.
- January 13, 2004: Microsoft releases a stand-alone tool to remove the MSBlast worm and its variants.
- February 15, 2004: A variant of the related worm Welchia is discovered on the internet.
- February 26, 2004: Symantec lowers their risk assessment of the Welchia worm to "Low" (category 2).
- March 12, 2004: McAfee lowers their risk assessment to "Low".
- April 21, 2004: A "B" variant is discovered.
- January 28, 2005: The creator of the B variant of MSBlaster is sentenced to 18 months in prison.

== Side effects ==
Although the worm can only spread on systems running Windows 2000 or Windows XP, it can cause instability in the RPC service on systems running other versions of Windows NT, including Windows Server 2003 and Windows XP Professional x64 Edition. In particular, the worm does not spread in Windows Server 2003 because Windows Server 2003 was compiled with the /GS switch, which detected the buffer overflow and shut the RPCSS process down.

When infection occurs, the buffer overflow causes the RPC service to crash, leading Windows to display the following message and then automatically reboot, usually after 60 seconds.

System Shutdown:

This system is shutting down. Please save all work in progress and log off. Any unsaved changes will be lost. This shutdown was initiated by NT AUTHORITY\SYSTEM

Time before shutdown: hours:minutes:seconds

Message:

Windows must now restart because the Remote Procedure Call (RPC) Service terminated unexpectedly.

This was the first indication many users had an infection; it often occurred a few minutes after every startup on compromised machines. A simple resolution to stop countdown is to run the "shutdown /a" command, causing some side effects such as an empty (without users) Welcome Screen. The Welchia worm had a similar effect. Months later, the Sasser worm surfaced, which caused a similar message to appear.

== See also ==
- Conficker
- Timeline of computer viruses and worms
- List of convicted computer criminals
- Zeus (malware)
