= Bulk email software =

Bulk email software is software that is used to send emails in large quantities.

Bulk email software usually refers to standalone software, while there are bulk email-sending web-based services.

== Types of software ==
Most bulk email software programs are hosted by third-party companies that sell access to their system. Customers pay per send or at a fixed monthly rate to have their own user account from which they can manage their contacts and send out email campaigns. Generally the advantage of this type of program is the reliability of the third party vendor and their application. Some bulk email software programs are self-hosted. The customer buys a license or develops his own program and then hosts the program. Generally the advantage of this type of program is the lack of ongoing monthly fees for the owner/developer of the program. The disadvantage of using this option is that the delivery rate is reduced as users frequently use one server to send bulk emails. There are various settings to tweak to avoid a server being labelled as spam.

These bulk email service providers help marketers conduct email marketing. These could be used for cold emailing or promotional email marketing.
