= Tripwire (disambiguation) =

A tripwire is a passive triggering mechanism such as a wire attached to a device.

Tripwire or tripwires may also refer to:

== Books ==
- Tripwire (novel), 1999 book by Lee Child
- Tripwire (novel), 2010 book by Steve Cole

== Games and comics ==
- Tripwire Interactive, a video game developer
- Tripwire (G.I. Joe), a character from the G.I. Joe universe

== Music ==
- The Tripwires, an American band
- Tripwires (British band)

== Other uses ==
- Tripwire (magazine), a genre culture entertainment publication based in the United Kingdom
- Tripwire (film), a 1990 American film directed by James Lemmo
- Tripwire force, a small but credible military force acting as a strategic deterrent
- Open Source Tripwire, open source intrusion detection software
  - Tripwire (company), a software company that builds and sells commercial versions of Tripwire-based software
