= Prelude SIEM =

Security information and event management software

- Original author: Yoann Vandoorselaere
- Developer: www.prelude-siem.org
- Initial release: 1998
- Stable release: 5.2.0 / September 11, 2020; 5 years ago
- Written in: Python, C
- Operating system: Linux, *NIX
- Standard: RFC4765
- Available in: French, English, German, Spanish, Italian, Polish, Portuguese, Russian
- Type: SIEM
- License: Proprietary software and GPLv2
- Website: www.prelude-siem.com www.prelude-siem.org
- Repository: www.prelude-siem.org/git/

Prelude SIEM is a security information and event management (SIEM) tool.

Prelude SIEM is a tool for IT security that collects and centralizes information about the company's IT security to offer a single point of view to manage it. It can create alerts about intrusions and security threats in the network in real-time using logs and flow analyzers. Prelude SIEM provides multiple tools for forensic reporting on big data to identify weak signals and advanced persistent threats (APTs). Prelude SIEM also includes tools for the exploitation phase to make work easier for operators and help them with risk management.

While a malicious user (or software) may be able to evade the detection of a single intrusion detection system, it becomes exponentially more difficult to get around defenses when there are multiple protection mechanisms. Prelude SIEM comes with a large set of sensors, each of them monitoring different event types. Prelude SIEM permits alert collection to the WAN scale, whether its scope covers a city, a country, a continent or the world.

Prelude SIEM is a SIEM system capable of inter-operating with all the systems available on the market. It implements natively with the Intrusion Detection Message Exchange Format (IDMEF, RFC 4765) format. In this way, it is natively IDMEF compatible with OpenSource IDS: AuditD, Nepenthes, NuFW, OSSEC, Pam, Samhain, Sancp, Snort, Suricata, Kismet, etc. but anyone can write their own IDS or use any of the third party sensors available, given Prelude SIEM's open APIs and libraries.

Since 2016, with the "Prelude IDMEF Partner Program", Prelude SIEM is now also IDMEF compatible with many commercial IDS.

Prelude SIEM provides all SIEM functions through three modules: ALERT (SEM), ANALYZE and ARCHIVE (SIM) and is so the only one true SIEM alternative on the market. Plus, Prelude SIEM promotes the use of IETF security standards through the SECEF project and the "Prelude IDMEF Partner Program".

== History ==
- 1998: Creation of an IDS project by Yoann Vandoorselaere: Prelude IDS
- 2002: Prelude becomes a Hybrid IDS
- 2005: Creation of the company Prelude-Technologies
- 2009: The INL Society acquires Prelude-Technologies
- 2009: INL become Edenwall Technologies
- 2011-08-18: Edenwall Technologies is declared for suspended payments, Prelude-IDS software, the company, and the brand are on sale
- 2011-10-13: CS (Communication & Systems), Edenwall partner, buy Prelude-IDS
- 2012: Opening of the websites: www.prelude-ids.org and www.prelude-ids.com (Now www.prelude-siem.com)
- 2012: Release of the new version Prelude OSS 1.1 and Prelude Enterprise 1.1
- 2014: Release of Prelude Enterprise V2
- 2014: Prelude IDS becomes Prelude SIEM and Prelude Enterprise becomes Prelude SOC
- 2015: Prelude SIEM received the award of "France Cybersecurity" (French cybersecurity)
- 2016: Prelude SIEM launch the "Prelude IDMEF Partner Program"
- 2016: Prelude SIEM OSS (Community version) received the award of OW2 for its community
- 2017: Release of Prelude SIEM 4.0, results of two years of research and developments efforts
- 2017: New packaging of Prelude SIEM available: Machine virtuelle

== Functions ==
Prelude SIEM collects, normalizes, sorts, aggregates, correlates and displays all security events regardless of the types of surveillance equipment. Beyond its capacity for processing of all types of event logs (system logs, syslog, flat files, etc.), it's also natively compatible with many IDS.

Prelude SIEM's main characteristics are the following:

- Built on an open-source core (Python, C), light web client 2.0
- "Agent-less" operation
- Compliant with Intrusion Detection Message Exchange Format (IDMEF, RFC 4765), Incident Object Description Exchange Format (IODEF, RFC 5070), HTTP, XML, SSL standards
- Smart Data: Smart correlation of security events
- Big Data: Collection, storage and indexing of logs
- Modular, flexible and resilient
- Hierarchical and decentralized architecture

== Prelude SIEM Community version ==
Prelude SIEM OSS has been designed in a scalable way to simply adapt to any environment. it is a free, public and open-source version (GPLV2) for small IT Infrastructures, tests and educational purposes.

The open-source version is composed of the following main modules:

- Manager: which receives and stores alerts into the database
- LibPrelude: connect each IDMEF agents to Prelude SIEM
- LibPreludeDB: high-speed database insertion module
- Correlator: event correlation module
- LML (Log Management Lackey): detect and normalize important logs
- Prewikka: web graphical user interface (GUI)

These modules are the base of the ALERT module in the commercial version. The commercial version also adds many functionalities to these modules and scale up the performances and architecture possibilities.

== Prelude SIEM and Prelude SOC ==
Prelude SIEM (commercial version) is a scalable, professionally usable and high-performance version of Prelude, for real-world environments. Prelude SOC is fully scaled version, mainly for SOC (Security Operations Center) usage.

The commercial versions are organized as follows:

- Prelude SIEM: SIEM for enterprise with modules: ALERT, ANALYSE, and ARCHIVE
  - ALERT: Storage, Detection, Normalization, Correlation, Aggregation, Real-time Notification
  - ANALYSE: Analyze, Reporting and Compliance
  - ARCHIVE: Storage, Indexation of logs and flows for forensic
- Prelude SOC: also to Prelude SIEM, it is possible to add more operational security modules to build a Security Operation Center (SOC)
  - MAP: Real-time cartography of the IT parc with security indicators. It is possible to drill down and made physical, logical or risk management representations
  - VULN: Vulnerability scanner based on OpenVAS. It is possible to use it inside the correlator to make cross-correlation
  - ASSET: Asset management based on GLPI (assets, tickets, workflow, etc.)
  - REPORT: Business Intelligence reporting
