= Ron Westrum =

American sociologist

Ronald "Ron" Westrum (born November 23, 1945) is an American sociologist.

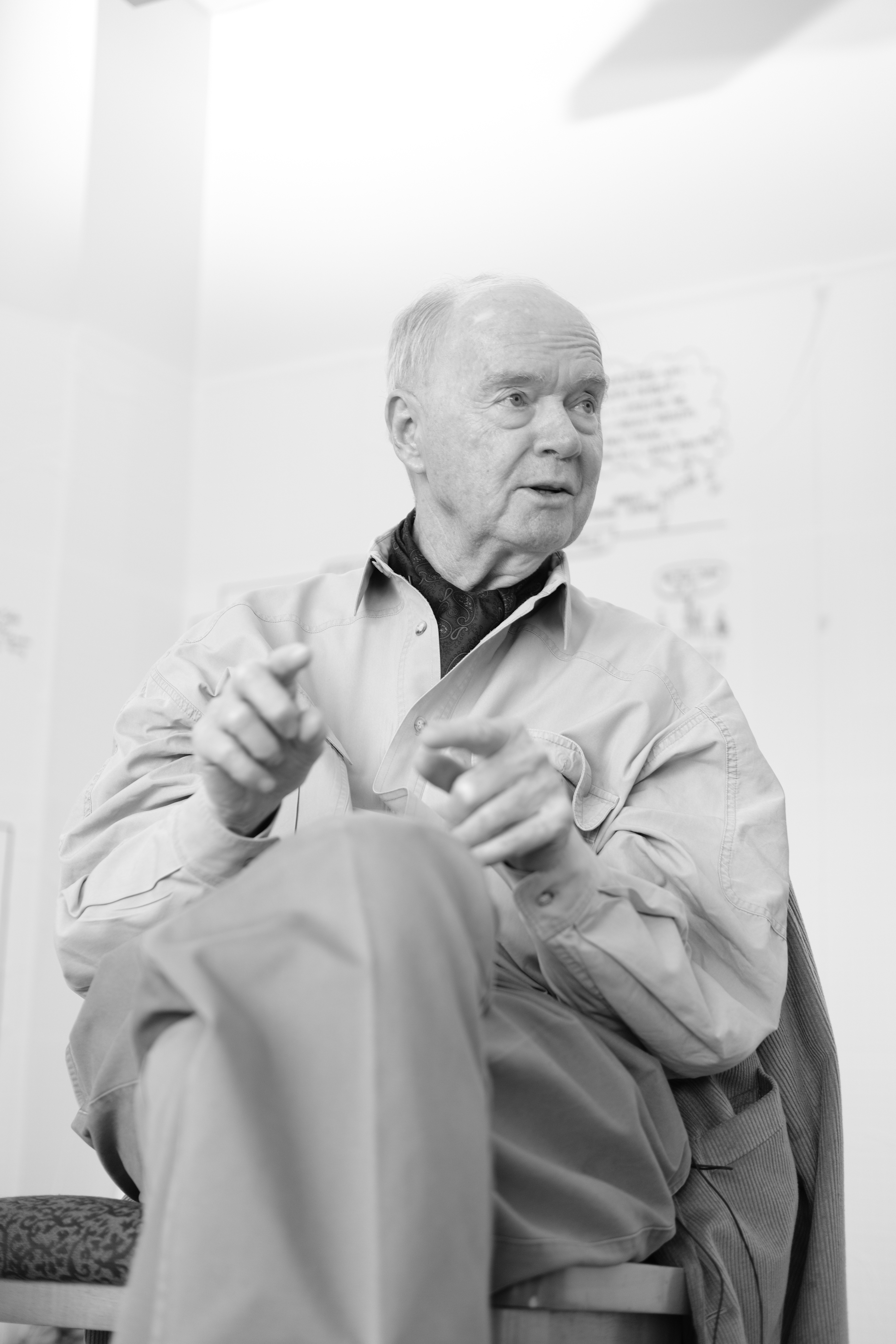
Ron Westrum

== Education ==
Born in Chicago in 1945, Westrum earned a B.A. (cum laude) in Social Relations in 1966 from Harvard University and a Ph.D. in Sociology in 1972 from the University of Chicago.

== Works ==
Over his career he has authored or co-authored approximately 50 papers, book chapters, and handbook entries in addition to his books.He is the author of Complex Organizations: Growth, Struggle, and Change, (with Kamil Samaha), Prentice-Hall, 1984; Sidewinder: Creative Missile Development at China Lake. Annapolis, Md.: Naval Institute Press, 1999. 33l pp.; and of Technologies: The Shaping of People and Things & Society.Belmont, Ca.: Wadsworth Publishing,1991. 394 pp.

== Organizational culture research ==
In 1988, Westrum presented a paper introducing what became known as the "Westrum continuum," a typology classifying organizational cultures as pathological, bureaucratic, or generative based on how information flows within them. The framework originated in his research on safety in high-risk, high-complexity technical domains such as aviation and healthcare, and was later adopted and empirically validated in the technology industry through DORA (DevOps Research and Assessment), notably in Forsgren, Humble, and Kim's book Accelerate: The Science of Lean Software and DevOps (2018), which found the framework predictive of software delivery and organizational performance.

== Recent work ==
As of 1987, he was professor of Sociology and Interdisciplinary Technology at Eastern Michigan University. He served 52 years on the faculty at Eastern Michigan University before retiring as Professor Emeritus of Sociology. He also spent six years as Professor II of Social Safety at the University of Stavanger, Norway, and held sabbatical positions at the Universities of Edinburgh and Hawaiʻi at Mānoa.

His papers include: “The Three Cultures Model,” presentation at Symposium on Patient Safety for Improving Florida’s Medical Education, January 2004. “Increasing the Number of Guards at Nuclear Power Plants,” Risk Analysis, Vol. 24, No. 4, 2004, pp. 959–961. “Models of Bureaucratic Failure,” in Innovation and Consolidation in Aviation, (Eds., Lawrence Erlbaum, 2004)

Interested in unidentified flying object reports, Westrum was a MUFON consultant.

Westrum is said to be a frequent critic of CSICOP and other skeptical organizations.

== Honors ==
He was the Scientist Guest of Honor at ConFusion XXX (January 23–25, 2004).

- Official website
