= Host-based intrusion detection system comparison =

Comparison of host-based intrusion detection system components and systems.

== Free and open-source software ==
As per the Unix philosophy a good HIDS is composed of multiple packages each focusing on a specific aspect.

Package	Last Update	Debian Official Repositories	AlmaLinux Official Repositories	openSUSE Official Repositories	File	Network	Logs	Config	Notes
OSSEC	2025	No	No	Yes	Yes	Yes	Yes	Yes	
Wazuh	2025	No	No	?	Yes	Yes	Yes	Yes	
Samhain	2025	Yes	No	Yes	Yes	No	Partial		
Snort	2025	Yes	No	No	No	Yes	No		
chkrootkit	2023	Yes	No	Yes	Yes	No	Partial		
rkhunter	2018	Yes	Yes	Yes	Yes	No	No	Yes	
unhide	2012	Yes	Yes	Yes	No	No	No		proc ps compare
Sguil	2017	No	No	No	No	Yes	No		
Logwatch	2017	Yes	Yes	Yes	No	No	Yes		
Logcheck	2017	Yes	Yes	Yes	No	No	Yes		
Epylog	2014	Yes	Yes	Yes	No	No	Yes		
SWATCH	2015	Yes	Yes	Yes	No	No	Yes		
sagan	2021	Yes	No	No	No	No	Yes		
aide	2025	Yes	Yes	Yes	Yes	No	No	yes	uses libs for routines
tripwire	2018	Yes	Yes	Yes	Yes	No	No		
Tiger	2018	Yes	No	No	Yes	No	No	Yes	3/42 modules are Debian specific.

== Proprietary software ==
Package	Year	Linux	Windows	File	Network	Logs	Config	Notes
Lacework	2018	Yes	No	Yes	Yes	Yes	Yes	
Verisys	2018	Yes	Yes	Yes	Yes		Yes	
Nessus	2017	Yes	Yes				Yes	
Atomicorp	2019	Yes	Yes	Yes	Yes	Yes	Yes	Commercially enhanced version of OSSEC
Spartan	2021	No	Yes	Yes	Yes	Yes	Yes	Websocket API, IP to Country mapping, DynDNS Integration
