= CloudPassage =

- Industry: Security company
- Founded: 2010
- Founder: Carson Sweet, CEO
- Headquarters: San Francisco, United States
- Brands: Halo
- Services: Cloud security, Software as a service
- Website: www.cloudpassage.com

CloudPassage is a company that provides an automation platform, delivered via software as a service, that improves security for private, public, and hybrid cloud computing environments. CloudPassage is headquartered in San Francisco.

== History ==
CloudPassage was founded by Carson Sweet, Talli Somekh, and Vitaliy Geraymovych in 2010. The company used cloud computing and big data analytics to implement security monitoring and control in a platform called Halo. CloudPassage spent a year in stealth developing the Halo technology, coming out of stealth mode to a closed beta in January 2011. In June 2012, the company launched the commercial product that included configuration security monitoring, network microsegmentation, and two-factor authentication for privileged access management. By 2013, CloudPassage expanded Halo to support large enterprises with advanced security and compliance requirements with a product called Halo Enterprise.

The first round of venture funding for the company raised $6.5 million. In April 2012, CloudPassage raised $14 million. The financing round was led by Tenaya Capital. In February 2014, CloudPassage announced that it had raised $25.5 million in funding led by Shasta Ventures. In total, the company has invested over $30 million in its technology and raised approximately $88 million in capital.

== Product ==
The CloudPassage platform provides cloud workload security and compliance for systems hosted in public or private cloud infrastructure environments, including hybrid cloud and multi-cloud workload hosting models. The flagship product the company offers is called Halo. Halo secures virtual servers in public, private, and hybrid cloud infrastructures and provides file integrity monitoring (FIM) while also administering firewall automation, vulnerability monitoring, network access control, security event alerting, and assessment. The Halo platform also provides security applications such as privileged access management, software vulnerability scanning, multifactor authentication, and log-based IDS.

In December 2013, CloudPassage set up six servers with Microsoft Windows and Linux operating systems and combinations of popular programs and invited hackers to attempt to hack into the servers. The top prize was $5,000 and the winning hacker was a novice that completed the task in four hours. CloudPassage programmed the servers to use basic default security settings to show how vulnerable cloud computing programs can be to security threats.

== Awards and recognition ==
In May 2011, Gigaom named CloudPassage in its list of the Top 50 Cloud Innovators. That same month, eWeek recognized CloudPassage as one of 16 Hot Startup Companies Flying Under the Radar.

SC Magazine named CloudPassage an Industry Innovator in the Virtualization and Cloud Security category in 2012. Also in 2012, The Wall Street Journal named CloudPassage a runner-up in the Information Security category of its Technology Innovation Awards.

The CloudPassage large-scale security program, Halo, won Best Security Solution in 2014 at the SIIA Codie awards.
