= Sagan (software) =

Log analysis software

- Original author(s): Champ Clark III
- Developer(s): Quadrant Information Security
- Stable release: 2.0.1 / 8 February 2021; 4 years ago
- Written in: C
- Operating system: Unix-like
- Available in: English
- Type: Log analysis
- License: GNU GPL v2
- Website: quadrantsec.com/sagan_log_analysis_engine

Sagan is an open source (GNU/GPLv2) multi-threaded, high performance, real-time log analysis & correlation engine developed by Quadrant Information Security that runs on Unix operating systems. It is written in C and uses a multi-threaded architecture to deliver high performance log & event analysis. Sagan's structure and rules work similarly to the Sourcefire Snort IDS/IPS engine. This allows Sagan to be compatible with Snort or Suricata rule management software and gives Sagan the ability to correlate with Snort IDS/IPS data.

Sagan supports different output formats for reporting and analysis, log normalization, script execution on event detection, GeoIP detection/alerting and time sensitive alerting.

== See also ==
- Host-based intrusion detection system comparison

== Sources ==
- HOWTO build Sagan on FreeBSD
- Champ Clark talks about Sagan on "Pauldotcom Security weekly" - December, 12th, 2013.
- Log, Log, Log Everything Remotely.
