= Sguil =

Network management software

- Original author: Bamm Visscher, Steve Halligan
- Stable release: 0.9.0 / April 4, 2014; 11 years ago
- Written in: Tcl/Tk
- Operating system: Cross-platform
- Type: Network Security Monitoring
- License: GPLv3
- Website: sguil.sourceforge.net

Sguil (pronounced sgweel or squeal) is a collection of free software components for Network Security Monitoring (NSM) and event driven analysis of IDS alerts. The sguil client is written in Tcl/Tk and can be run on any operating system that supports these. Sguil integrates alert data from Snort, session data from SANCP, and full content data from a second instance of Snort running in packet logger mode.

Sguil is an implementation of a Network Security Monitoring system. NSM is defined as "collection, analysis, and escalation of indications and warnings to detect and respond to intrusions."

Sguil is released under the GPL 3.0.

== Tools that make up Sguil ==
Tool	Purpose
MySQL 4.x or 5.x	Data storage and retrieval
Snort 2.x / Suricata	Intrusion detection alerts, scan detection, packet logging
Barnyard / Barnyard2	Decodes IDS alerts and sends them to sguil
SANCP	TCP/IP session records
Tcpflow	Extract an ASCII dump of a given TCP session
p0f	Operating system fingerprinting
tcpdump	Extracts individual sessions from packet logs
Wireshark	Packet analysis tool (used to be called Ethereal)

== See also ==
- Sagan
- Intrusion detection system (IDS)
- Intrusion prevention system (IPS)
- Network intrusion detection system (NIDS)
- Metasploit Project
- nmap
- Host-based intrusion detection system comparison
