= CS Communication & Systèmes =

French information technology service company

CS Group
- Industry: energy industry space industry transport industry defence industry
- Founded: 1902 ( as Compagnie des Signaux et d'Entreprises Electriques, (signal and electric projects company)); 1999: CS is established
- Headquarters: Paris, France
- Key people: Yazid Sabeg (chairman)
- Products: Intelligent & cyber-protected mission-critical systems
- Net income: €202 million (FY 2018)
- Number of employees: 2000 (FY 2018)
- Website: uk.c-s.fr

CS Group, initially known as Communication & Systèmes (CS), is a French information-technology service company listed on the Paris Bourse as a member of the CAC Small index. The company designs information systems, develops and integrates software, manages projects and deploys industrial applications. Apart from that, it provides science, technology, and consulting services. CS Group is the third largest supplier of traffic-management systems in the world and provides information technology consulting services.

The company's headquarters are in Paris, with 12 others located throughout France. Regional headquarters or subsidiaries are found in Germany, Romania, Canada, the United Arab Emirates, India, and the United States. CS Group has nearly 2,000 employees.

== Products ==
=== Defense, space and security ===
CS Group deploys command and control information systems:

- Operations command information systems: Air and naval defense, homeland security, and intelligence
- Space systems and applications: Flight dynamics, space surveillance and environmental safety
- Information and communication systems security: Simulation and virtual-reality systems, electronic warfare and mission-critical information systems
- Security consulting: Audit, support and assistance and risk analysis
- Technologies and systems for the detection and neutralization of light drones. Boreades, built around centralized supervision, can detect, identify and pursue drones, neutralize them, and recover them.
- Products: Prelude (a SIEM), Vigilo (a network-supervision tool), PKI, time stamping and archiving

Diginext, a CS Group subsidiary, also produces and markets in the fields of:

- Tactical data links
- Simulation and virtual-reality systems
- Navigation and geolocation systems
- Electronic warfare
- Mission-critical information systems

=== Aeronautics ===
CS Group supplies aircraft manufacturers with embedded systems and motor parts for aircraft manufacturing, providing product lifecycle management, simulators and tests.

=== Energy ===
In nuclear safety and radioactive waste management, CS Group produces high-performance simulators and creates specialized scientific software. The firm participated in creating simulator platforms for nuclear plants (including specialized simulators of EDF, the French electric company).

=== CS INDIA Bangalore ===
CS Group India Private Limited was started in 2011. CS provides engineering s, services to aircraft engine manufacturers. CS Communication & Systèmes designs, integrates and operates systems worldwide. It offers operations command information systems for joint armed forces, air defense and naval, homeland security, armed forces training, intelligence, and support and logistics information systems applications; space systems and applications for use in ground segment and space services, flight dynamics, space surveillance, and environmental safety; information and communication systems security services, such as audit, consulting, and design of secure architectures, as well as authentication services and cyber defense services. The company also provides Diginext products in the fields of tactical data links, simulation and virtual reality systems, navigation and geo-localization systems, electronic warfare, and mission-critical information systems. In addition, it offers digital design products, including HPC and simulation products, digital mock-ups, enterprise content management services, and product lifecycle management services, as well as simulators for engineering, training, and maintenance. The company provides embedded systems, such as NSS, FWS, FADEC, ATC/ATM, cockpit displays, etc.; engineering, development and integration, maintenance, testing, and certification services for aeronautics, automobiles, energy, mobile phones, railway transportation, etc.; and nuclear safety services for nuclear waste management, safety studies, and crisis centers, as well as supervision, command, and control. Further, it offers technical information systems comprising technical documentation and respect for production constraints; security systems for encryption and implementation in networking equipment, identification and validation, non-reversible transactions, data and interchange confidentiality, secured application flows, and rights management and attribution; and radio-telephone-intercom integrated services.

=== CS Inc ===
CS Group Inc was established in 2015 in East Hartford, CT to work with clients based in the United States. This is the company's first US branch and since its conception, it has secured several clients, including Pratt & Whitney and Triumph Engine Controls. The US branch now employs over 25 people, including software engineers, design engineers, and IPT leads who mainly work on Aircraft Engine design and Software Testing in accordance with DO-178B. CS Inc. has worked on several commercial engines, including the PW1100 for the Airbus A320 Neo, PW1500 for the Bombardier CS series and the PW1900 for the Embraer E-jets. More recent projects include military engines as well for which the company has formed a new military division.

=== Other activities ===
CS Group develops a computational fluid dynamics software service based on the Lattice-Boltzmann method: ProLB. Low dissipation and dispersion errors combined with state-of-the-art turbulence modeling approaches (Large Eddy Simulations), allow ProLB to perform high-fidelity aeroacoustic and aerodynamic simulations of weakly compressible flows.

Revenue
| Year | € (million) |
|---|---|
| 2008 | 221.7 |
| 2009 | 205.6 |
| 2010 | 194.8 |
| 2011 | 204.4 |
| 2012 | 172.8 |
| 2013 | 162.0 |
| 2014 | 133.1 |
| 2015 | 133.3 |
| 2016 | 130.6 |
| 2017 | 129.2 |
| 2018 | 141.3 |
| 2019 | 230.0 |
| 2020 | 209.3 |
