= Vulnerability assessment (computing) =

Identification of security risks in IT systems

Vulnerability assessment is a process of defining, identifying and classifying the security holes in information technology systems. An attacker can exploit a vulnerability to violate the security of a system. Some known vulnerabilities are Authentication Vulnerability, Authorization Vulnerability and Input Validation Vulnerability.

== Purpose ==
Before deploying a system, it first must go through from a series of vulnerability assessments that will ensure that the build system is secure from all the known security risks. When a new vulnerability is discovered, the system administrator can again perform an assessment, discover which modules are vulnerable, and start the patch process. After the fixes are in place, another assessment can be run to verify that the vulnerabilities were actually resolved. This cycle of assess, patch, and re-assess has become the standard method for many organizations to manage their security issues.

The primary purpose of the assessment is to find the vulnerabilities in the system, but the assessment report conveys to stakeholders that the system is secured from these vulnerabilities. If an intruder gained access to a network consisting of vulnerable Web servers, it is safe to assume that he gained access to those systems as well. Because of assessment report, the security administrator will be able to determine how intrusion occurred, identify compromised assets and take appropriate security measures to prevent critical damage to the system.

== Assessment types ==
Depending on the system a vulnerability assessment can have many types and level.

=== Host assessment ===
A host assessment looks for system-level vulnerabilities such as insecure file permissions, application level bugs, backdoor and Trojan horse installations. It requires specialized tools for the operating system and software packages being used, in addition to administrative access to each system that should be tested. Host assessment is often very costly in term of time, and thus is only used in the assessment of critical systems. Tools like COPS and Tiger are popular in host assessment.

=== Network assessment ===
In a network assessment one assess the network for known vulnerabilities. It locates all systems on a network, determines what network services are in use, and then analyzes those services for potential vulnerabilities. This process does not require any configuration changes on the systems being assessed. Unlike host assessment, network assessment requires little computational cost and effort.

== Vulnerability assessment vs penetration testing ==
Vulnerability assessment and penetration testing are two different testing methods. They are differentiated on the basis of certain specific parameters.

Vulnerability assessment vs Penetration testing
	Vulnerability Scan	Penetration Test
How often to run	Continuously, especially after new equipment is loaded	Once a year
Reports	Comprehensive baseline of what vulnerabilities exist and changes from the last report	Short and to the point, identifies what data was actually compromised
Metrics	Lists known software vulnerabilities that may be exploited	Discovers unknown and exploitable exposures to normal business processes
Performed by	In house staff, increases expertise and knowledge of normal security profile.	Independent outside service
Expense	Low to moderate: about $1200 / yr + staff time	High: about $10,000 per year outside consultancy
Value	Detective control, used to detect when equipment is compromised	Preventative control used to reduce exposures
