= Sigma (signature format) =

Sigma is a signature format based on pattern matching for system logging, to detect malicious behavior in computer systems.

== See also ==
- YARA
- Snort
