= Maggie Björklund =

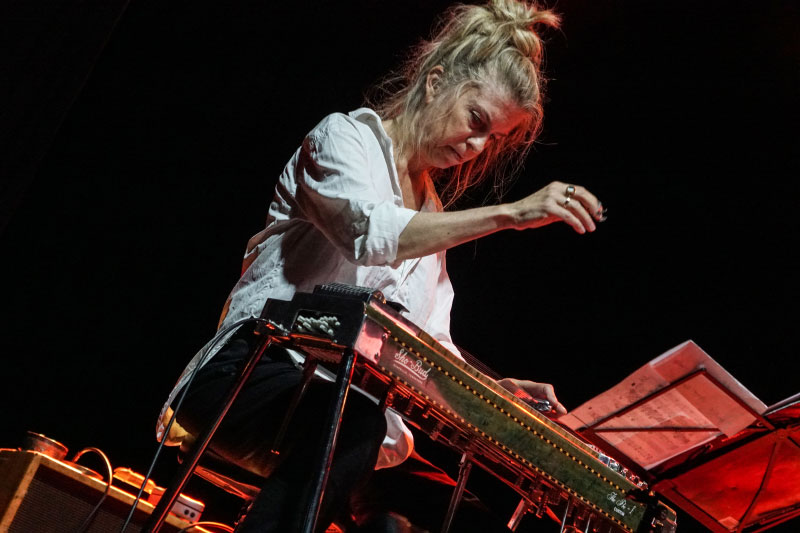
- Aarhus 2020

Background information
- Born: Margrethe Björklund; Denmark
- Origin: Copenhagen, Denmark
- Genres: Country; Indie rock Psychedelia; Pop
- Years active: 1991–present
- Label: Bloodshot Records
- Website: MaggieBjorklund.com

Margrethe "Maggie" Björklund is a Danish guitarist and singer-songwriter who composes, plays, and sings music in the folk and alternative country genres. She began her career playing electric guitar in the female band The Darleens and briefly for the experimental pop band Miss B Haven. Björklund then started playing pedal steel guitar as a studio musician and has released two solo recordings.

== Early life ==
Maggie Björklund was born in Denmark and grew up near Copenhagen. She took piano lessons, but switched to guitar as soon as she could. She moved to Hollywood and attended the Musicians Institute, where she was introduced to country music. She returned to Denmark after a year.

== Career ==
Back in Denmark, she formed the all-female country band Darleens, and they recorded three albums for Sony Records. After Darleens split up, she took pedal steel guitar lessons from Jeff Newman in Nashville, Tennessee.

Her 2011 debut Coming Home was produced by Johnny Sangster (The Tripwires). The record featured members of Calexico, and guest vocalists Mark Lanegan (Screaming Trees), Jon Auer (The Posies), and Rachel Flotard (Visqueen).

After the album's release, she played pedal steel with Jack White's all-female backing band, the Peacocks. In 2011 and 2012 she performed at South by Southwest in Austin, Texas. She also toured with John Doe and with Exene Cervenka from the band X.

For her sophomore album Shaken, released in 2014, she enlisted John Convertino (Calexico), Barb Hunter (Afghan Whigs), and Jim Barr (Portishead). John Parish (producer for Sparklehorse) was producer, and Kurt Wagner (Lambchop) provided a guest vocal. The songs reflected the impact of the death of her mother.

== Discography ==
=== Maggie Björklund ===
LPs

- 2011: Coming Home (Bloodshot Records BS 174)
- 2014: Shaken (Bloodshot Records BS 221)

Singles

- 1996: Margrethe Björklund CD Single (self-released MB 9601)

Appears on

- 1994: Kirsten Siggaard - Sirenernes Favn (Scandinavian Records 966 031-2)
- 2002: Superheroes - Superheroes (Crunchy Frog FROG 027-2)
- 2004: Sara Indrio - Dark Clouds, Silver Linings (Playground Music Scandinavia - TPCD-401)
- 2005: Jens K - Luksus Og Laser (Playground Music PGMJKCD 1001)
- 2006: Mark Pickerel & His Praying Hands - Snake In The Radio (Bloodshot Records BS 129)
- 2007: Ginman / Jimmy Jørgensen - Deep (Universal Denmark 174 800-5)
- 2010: Rusty Willoughby - Cobirds Unite (self-released)
- 2011: Exene Cervenka - The Excitement of Maybe (Bloodshot Records BS 177)
- 2012: Giant Sand - Tucson (Fire Records FIRECD262)
- 2013: Mark Pickerel & His Praying Hands - Tess (Candy Cross PWCCR 1301)
- 2014: Gruff Rhys - American Interior (Turnstile TS008LP)
- 2014: Jack White - Lazaretto (Third Man Records – TMR-271)
- 2015: Giant Sand - Heartbreak Pass (New West Records NW5105)
- 2016: Jack White - Acoustic Recordings 1998-2016 (Third Man Records TMR-387)

=== Darleens ===
LPs

- 1991: Darleens (Columbia 469259 1)
- 1993: Twisted (Columbia 473751 2)
- 2003: This Is Darleens (Rocky Love Records, Music NetWork Records SMEK 03)

EPs

- 1992: Cold Cold Christmas (Columbia 658808)
- 2001: Soft and Sweet

Singles

- 1991: I Cry Over You (Columbia 657583 7)
- 1993: All Is Right (Columbia 659604 1)
