= ACARM (software) =

- Original authors: Bartłomiej Balcerek; Bartosz Szurgot; Wojciech Waga; Marcin Wojtkiewicz
- Developer: WCSS
- Release: 2008.04.01
- Final release: 0.1.0 / October 5, 2009
- Written in: Java
- Operating system: cross-platform
- Successor: ACARM-ng
- Type: Intrusion-detection system
- License: GPL
- Website: http://www.acarm.wcss.wroc.pl (no longer available for download)

ACARM (Alert Correlation, Assessment and Reaction Module) is an open source intrusion detection system. It was developed as a part of POSITIF project between 2004 and 2007. It was written as a practical proof of concept, presented in the article.

== Filters architecture ==
The following image shows chain-like architecture for filters, as used in the system.

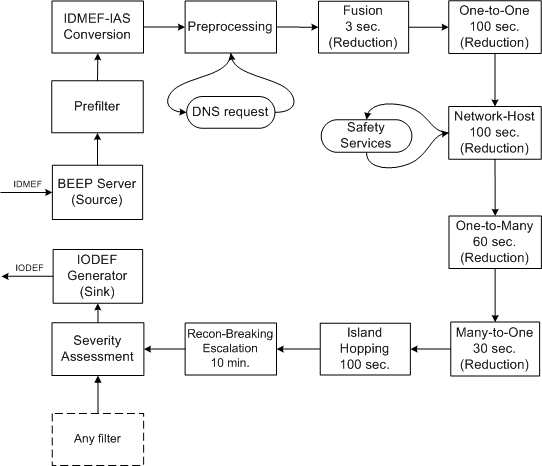

Each alert enters each filter, stays there for a specified amount of time and proceeds further in chain. Main issue with such an approach is that alter can be reported only after its processing is done, which in turn takes at least few minutes.

== Notes ==
Project is no longer maintained. It has been replaced with new, plug-in-based ACARM-ng.

== See also ==
- ACARM-ng
- Intrusion detection system (IDS)
- Prelude Hybrid IDS
- BEEP
