= The Tripwires =

American rock band

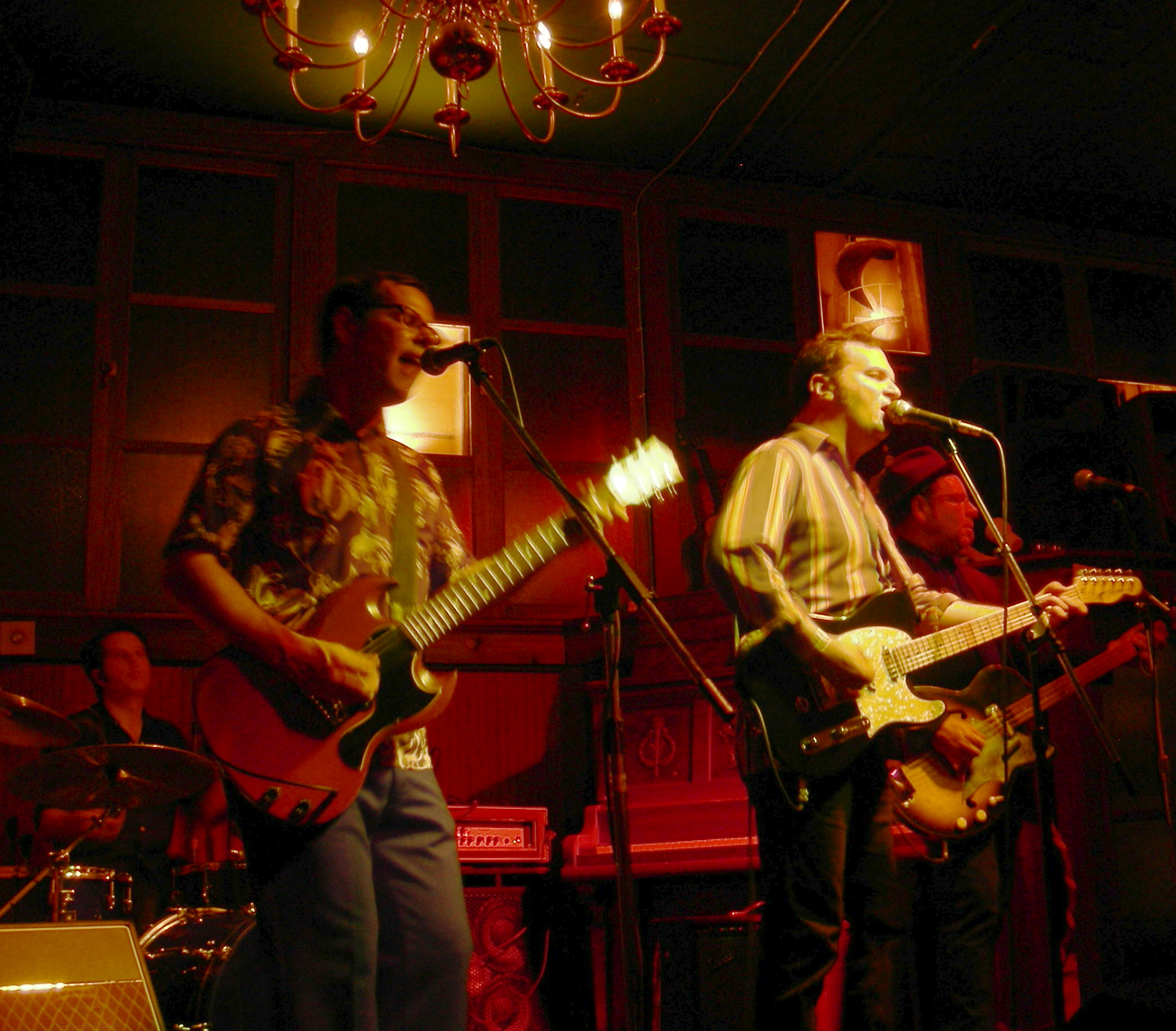
- The Tripwires at Conor Byrne during Reverb Fest 2007; L to R: Mark Pickerel (drums), Johnny Sangster, John Ramberg, Jim Sangster (bass)

Background information
- Origin: Seattle, Washington U.S.
- Genre: Rock
- Years active: 2006–present
- Labels: The Paisley Pop Label; Spark & Shine; Folc Records; Tym Records
- Members: Dan Peters; John Ramberg; Jim Sangster; Johnny Sangster
- Past members: Mark Pickerel

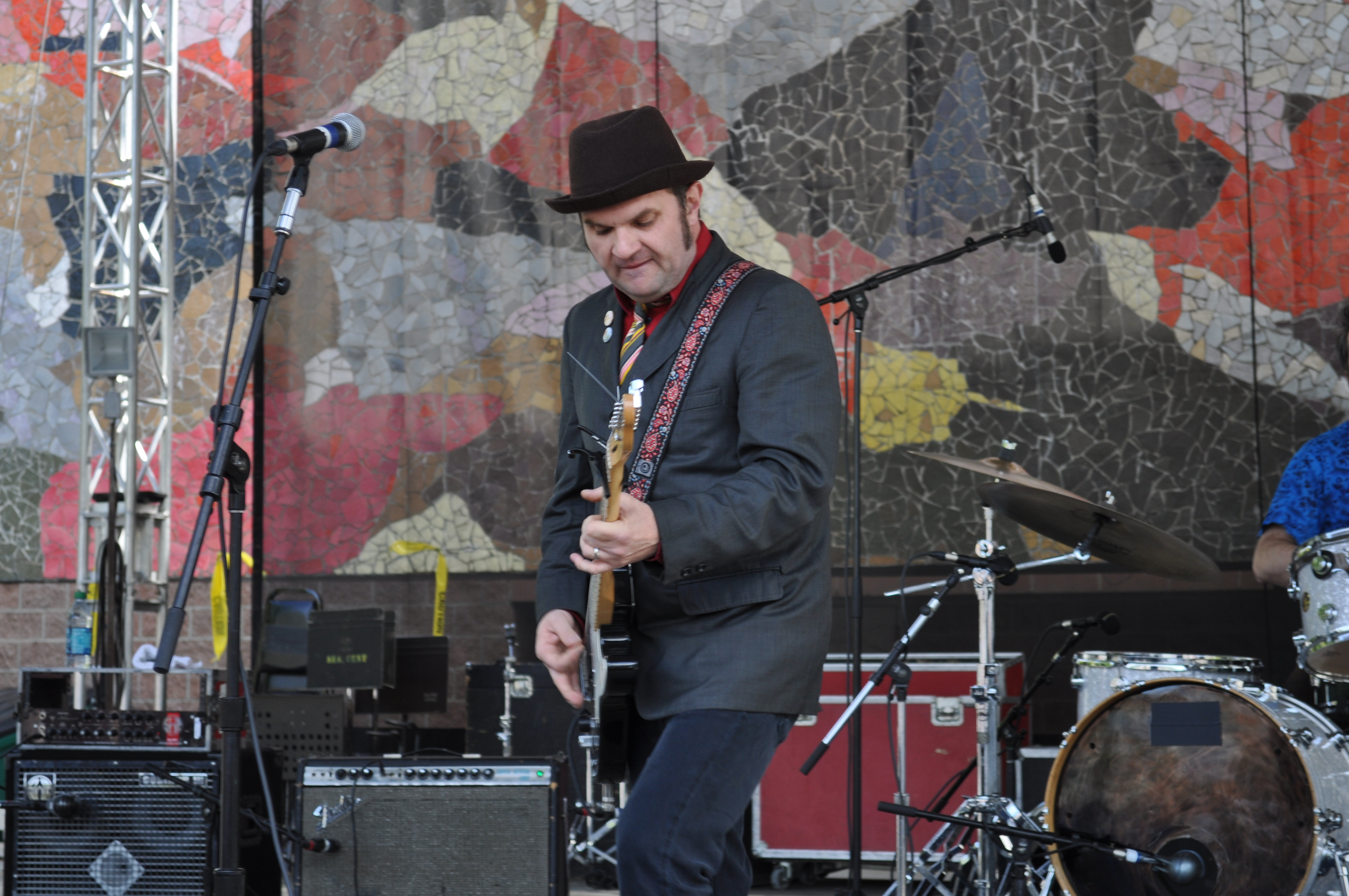
John Ramberg and the Tripwires at Bumbershoot

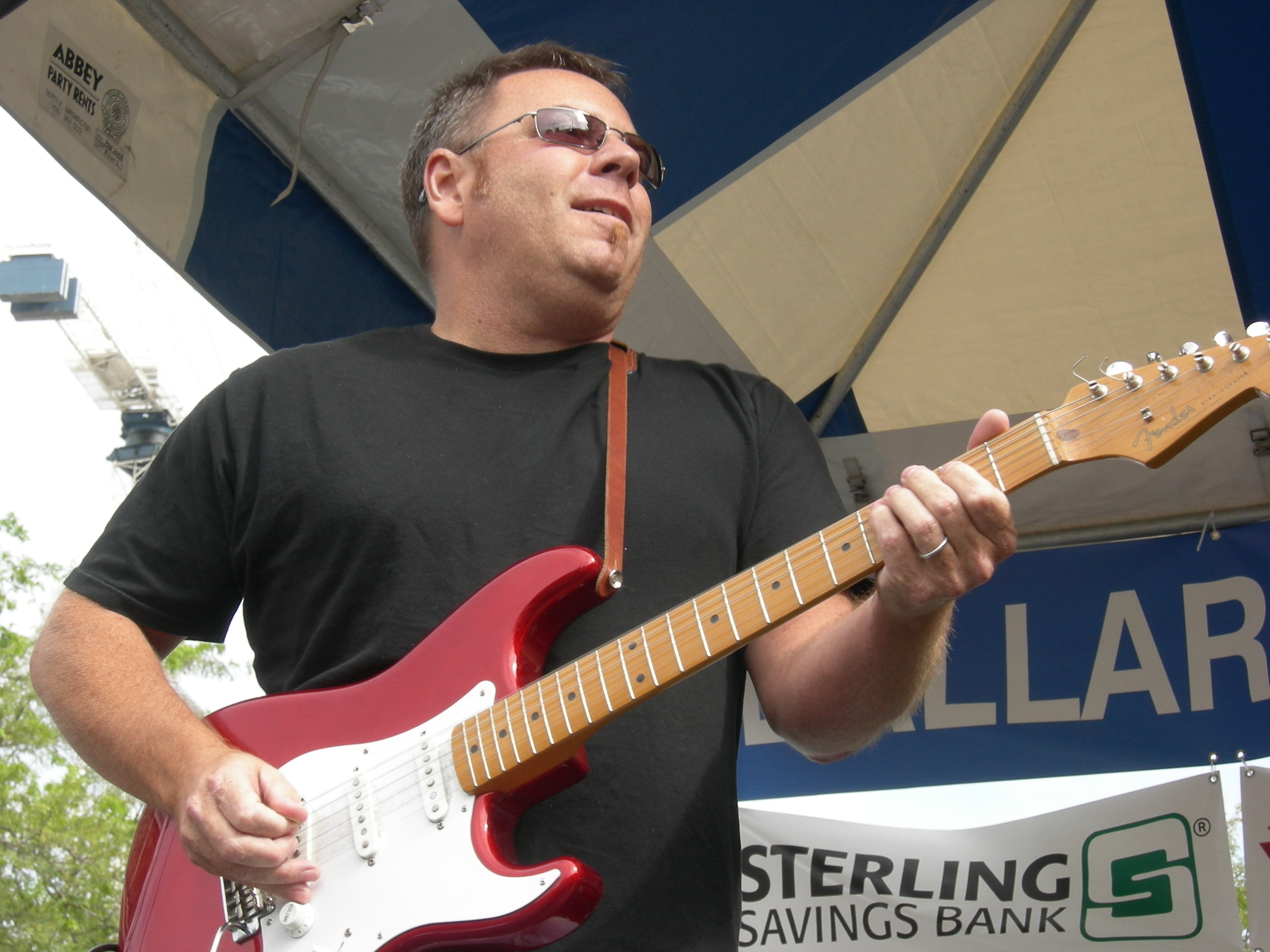
Jim Sangster performing with the Christy McWilson Band at the Ballard Seafood Fest

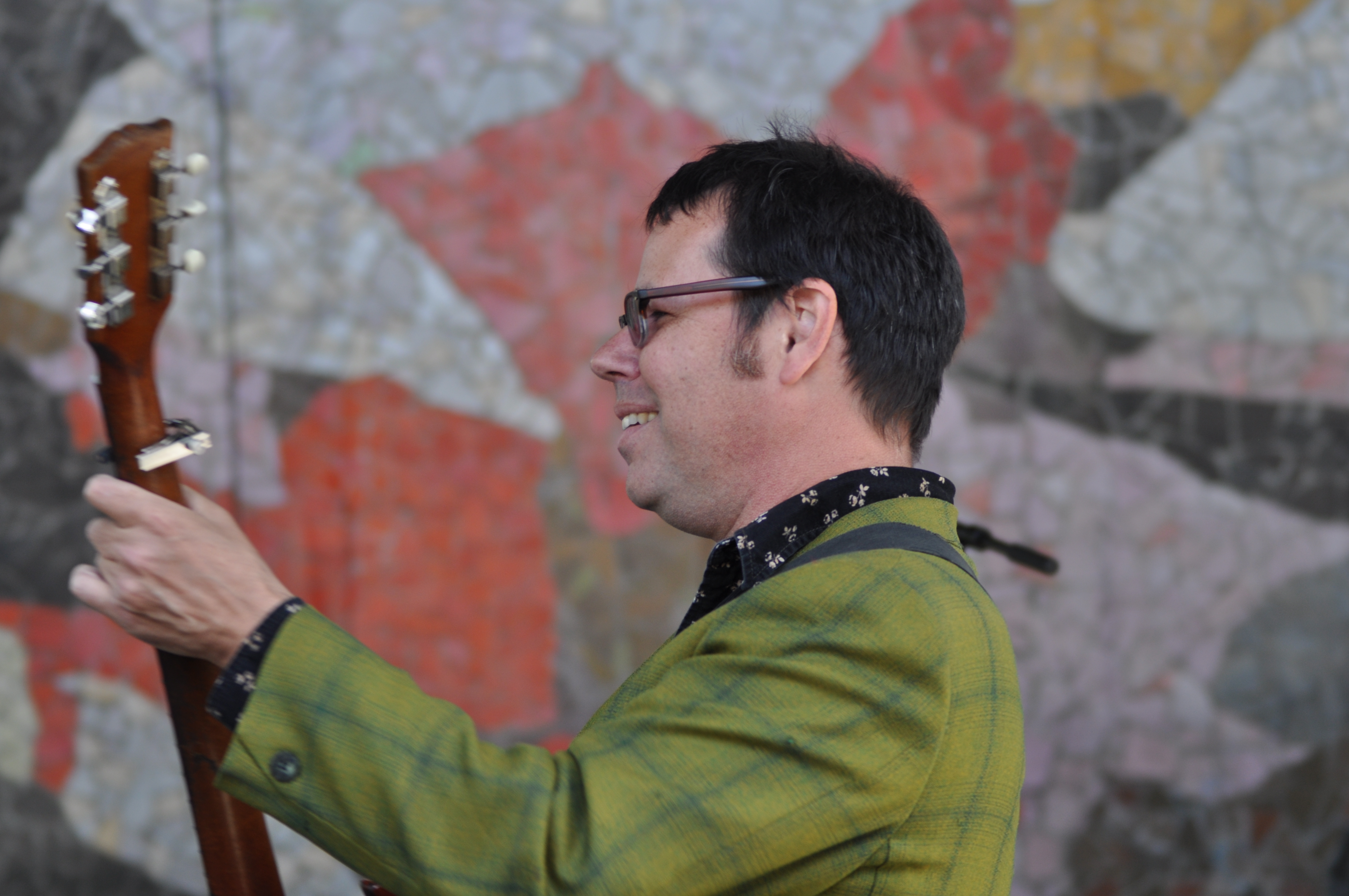
Johnny Sangster and The Tripwires play at Bumbershoot

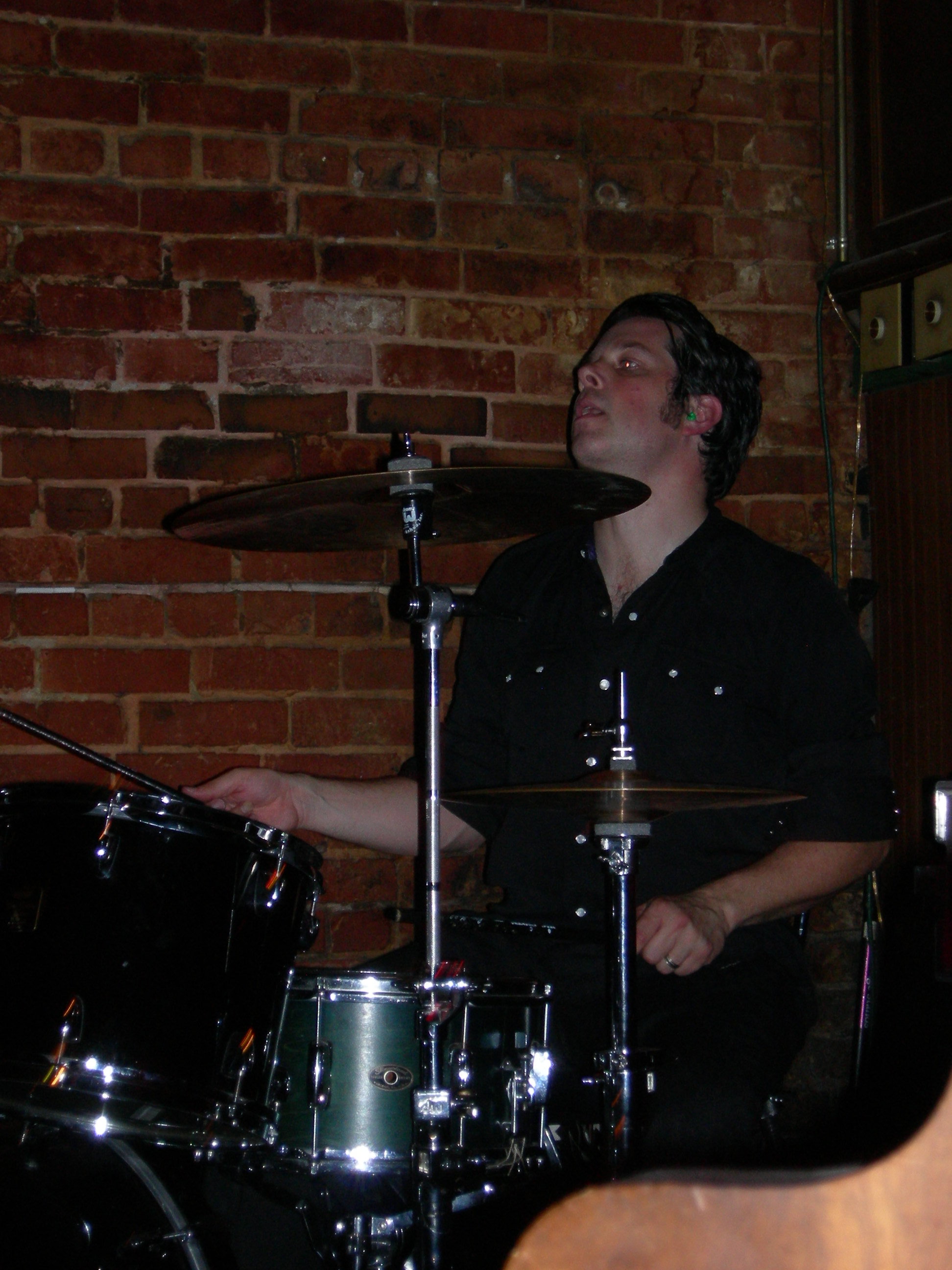
Mark Pickerel drumming with The Tripwires during Reverb Fest 2007

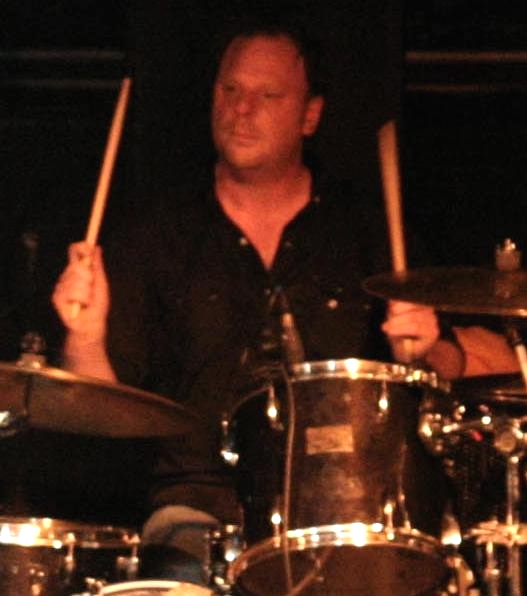
Dan Peters on drums

The Tripwires are a Seattle, Washington–based rock supergroup made up of well known local musicians Dan Peters, John Ramberg, and brothers Jim and Johnny Sangster, all of whom have been members of bands that include The Minus 5, Screaming Trees, and The Young Fresh Fellows.

== Formation and early years ==
Brothers Jim Sangster and Johnny Sangster grew up in Seattle, Washington, but spent summers on Lopez Island, Washington, where their parents have resided since 1988. The brothers attended a year of high school on the island, where they formed their first bands, performing at the high school and the American Legion hall.

In 1984, Johnny relocated to Denmark, where he led the Copenhagen-based The Sharing Patrol until 1997. Returning to Seattle in 1997, he connected with Egg Studios owner Conrad Uno, who enlisted Johnny's engineering assistance.

After recording 4 albums with The Model Rockets, John Ramberg had begun work on a solo album with drummer Bill Rieflin (R.E.M., Ministry, The Minus 5). In 2006, those sessions, with the contribution of the Sangster brothers, evolved into the formation of the group The Tripwires.

== Releases ==
The first The Tripwires album Makes You Look Around was released in 2007 on the Paisley Pop label and featured support from Scott McCaughey and technical help from Kurt Bloch. Reviewers praised the album, calling it melodic but powerful pop, bright and propulsive, filled with melodic hooks.

A second album, House to House, was released in 2009 on the Spark & Shine label, featuring production by Johnny Sangster and engineering by Sangster and Jon Erwie. The album was described in reviews as explosive power pop.

In 2014, a third album Get Young was released, this time on the Folc Records label. It was recorded by Jack Endino (Nirvana, Soundgarden, Mark Lanegan, Afghan Whigs) and produced by Johnny Sangster. The album was released via Bandcamp. Reviews were positive, citing similarities to Squeeze and Elvis Costello, and describing the music as pub rock for a new generation.

A 2017 EP Fat City Let's Go! was released on ten-inch vinyl and digitally via Folc/Bandcamp. The EP cover features art by Jeremy Eaton.

== Band members ==
- John Ramberg, vocals and guitar. Ramberg led Seattle bands Stumpy Joe and The Model Rockets. He has also performed with The Minus Five and Neko Case & Her Boyfriends.
- Jim Sangster, vocals, bass and guitar. Sangster has also performed with The Young Fresh Fellows, The Minus 5, The Picketts, Fun At The Zoo, Mark Pickerel and His Praying Hands, Roy Loney and the Longshots, and Thee Sgt. Major III.
- Johnny Sangster, vocals and guitar. In addition to his work with The Tripwires, Sangster has played with Mark Pickerel and his Praying Hands, Model Rockets, Maggie Björklund, The Basements, Cobirds Unite, Dear John Letters, and Steve Turner and His Bad Ideas.
- Mark Pickerel, drums. Pickerel is best known as the original drummer for the Screaming Trees. He also leads the band, Mark Pickerel and His Praying Hands. In 2012, Mark Pickerel amiably parted ways with the band, and Dan Peters (Mudhoney) took his place on drums.
- Dan Peters, drums. Over the course of his career, Peters has also drummed with Mudhoney and Nirvana.

== Other projects ==
=== The Sharing Patrol ===
In the early 80s, Johnny Sangster (guitar, vocals) and Jonathan Stibbard (drums) formed The Sharing Patrol in Seattle, Washington. Henrik Tuxen (bass) joined in 1984 when Johnny and Jonathan moved to Copenhagen, Denmark. The band released four albums before Sangster returned to Seattle in 1997. The Sharing Patrol recorded for EMI Records and toured Europe, Scandinavia, and the former Soviet Union.

=== Stumpy Joe ===
John Ramberg (lead vocals, guitar) led this Seattle-based band. Other members included Mark Hoyt (lead guitar, vocals), Christian Wilson (bass, piano), and Scott Russell (drums). They released one album: One Way Rocket Ride To Kicksville! in 1991. Scott McCaughey co-produced, engineered, and mixed the recording.

=== The Model Rockets ===
John Ramberg led this Seattle-area band, which still performs on occasion. In 1993, when Stumpy Joe disbanded, several ex-members formed a new band: Glory Stompers. The name was already taken, so they changed the name of the band to The Model Rockets. Initially, The Model Rockets consisted of John Ramberg (guitar, lead vocals), Grant Johnson (guitar), Boyd Remillard (bass), and Graham Black (drums). In 1994, Johnson was replaced by Scott Sutherland (Chemistry Set). Their debut album, Hilux, (Lucky Records) was produced by Scott McCaughey (The Young Fresh Fellows). A second album, 1996's Snatch It Back and Hold It (C/Z) was followed by a tour of Spain.

In 1998, The Model Rockets released At El Sol / Sold Out. This album was recorded live in Madrid, Spain. 2003's Pilot County Suite was their most recent recording.

=== Sangster Family Band ===
Jim and Johnny Sangster have performed occasionally as part of the Sangster Family Band, which includes their mother Patsy, their father John (now deceased), Jim's two children, and Johnny's three children.

=== Sangster Meets Benson/Benson Meets Sangster ===
In 2002, Johnny Sangster recorded one album with Robb Benson (Dear John Letters, Nevada Bachelors). The Sangster Meets Benson/Benson Meets Sangster album was described as an experimental pop collaboration.

=== case/lang/veirs tour ===
In 2016, Johnny toured as guitarist with Neko Case, kd lang, and Laura Veirs in support of their case/lang/veirs album.

=== Crackle & Pop! Recording Studio ===
Johnny Sangster works as an audio engineer operating the Crackle & Pop! recording studio in Seattle, Washington, with partners Andrew Smith and Scott Masoner.

== Discography ==
=== The Tripwires ===
LPs

- 2008: Makes You Look Around (The Paisley Pop Label pop020169)
- 2009: House to House (Spark & Shine)
- 2014: Get Young (Folc Records FOLC033)

EPs

- 2017: Fat City Let's Go (House Frolic/Folc Records FOLC062)

Singles

- 2016: The Tripwires / Phantom Ships – "Paper Crown" / "There's This Girl" (Tym Records TYM 041)

Compilations

- 2014: More Super Hits of the Seventies! – Track 19, "2-4-6-8 Motorway" (Mike Shell)
- 2015: We Want To Be Black Vol. 4 – Track A1, "C'mon and Swim" (Folc Records FOLC041)
- 2016: Super Hits of the Seventies: Hit Explosion! – Track 17, "Games People Play" (Mike Shell)
- 2017: Super Hits of the Seventies: Pure Dyn-O-Mite! – Track 15, "Motorcycle Mama" (Mike Shell)

=== The Model Rockets ===
LPs

- 1993: Hilux (Lucky Records)
- 1996: Snatch It Back and Hold It (C/Z Records)
- 1998: At El Sol / Sold Out (Impossible Records IMPCD 051)
- 2002: Tell The Kids The Cops Are Here (Not Lame Recordings 72)
- 2003: Pilot County Suite (Book Records 6)

Singles

- 1994: Shapeshifter – "Shapeshifter" / "Walking Out On Love" (Bands We Like BWL 005)
- 1996: Stick It Out – "Stick It Out" / "Waiting For You" (Rock & Roll Inc. R&R inc. 707)
- 1996: Model Rockets, Tube Top (Split 7) – "Model Rockets: World Won't Let Me" / "Tube Top: The Rules" (Collective Fruit CF-7003)

Compilations

- 1994: 13 Soda Punx – A Top Drawer Compilation – Track 12, "Balcony" (Top Drawer Records)
- 1994: The World Of The Zombies – Track 7, "This Will Be Our Year" (Popllama PLCD-85)
- 1994: Imposible Records Presents Lucky Records – Track 16, "New Cinnamon Girl" (Impossible Records IMP-036)
- 1995: UniverSOnoro Volumen 1 Track 14, "New Cinnamon Girl" (Boa BOA 10307001)
- 1996: UniverSOnoro Volumen 2 – Track 3, "Stick It Out" (Boa BOA 10308002)
- 1997: English Rose – Tribute To The Jam – Track 12, "I Got By In Time" (Alfa ALCA-5198)
- 2003: One Day In Colour – Track 6, "Ugly Jacket" (Grabaciones En El Mar GELMAR169)
- 2004: Super Charged Flash Light Pops – Track 6, "A Notice To Everyone" (Not Lame Recordings)
- 2007: Little Steven's Underground Garage Presents The Coolest Songs In The World! Vol. 4 – Track 10, "Dress Up Girls" (Wicked Cool Record Co. WC706)
- 2014: Souvenirs: Little Gems of Pop Volume II – Track 7, "Hitchhiker Jane" (Sound Asleep Records WON 002)

=== Stumpy Joe ===
LPs

- 1991: One Way Rocket Ride To Kicksville! (PopLlama Records PL66)
- 1993: Poor, Poor, Stumpy Joe Blow Each Others Heads Off (Bands We Like BWL 002))

Singles

- 1989: Daydreams – "Daydreams" / "Basket Case" (Estrus Records ES-72)
- 1991: The Estrus 7" Combo Deluxe (with Mono Men, Game for Vultures, Marble Garden – "Day Dreams" / "Basket Case" (Estrus Records ESBX2 – ES-72)
- 1991: Love Plumbin' – "Love Plumbin" / "I.W.S.B. (I Want Some Bud)" (PopLlama Records PL7-35)
- 1993: Sugar And Glue – "Sugar And Glue" / "Welcome Back (Kotter's Theme)" (Top Drawer Records TDR V2)

Compilations

- 1992: Hodge Podge & Barrage From Japan – Track 3: "Proverbial Straw" (1 + 2 Records 021)

=== The Sharing Patrol ===
LPs

- 1986: Day After Yesterday (Sound Of Music SOUND 104)
- 1986: ... And Now The Sharing Patrol (Sound Of Music SOUND 1202)
- 1990: The Sharing Patrol (EMI)
- 1992: Chainsaw Boogie (EMI)
- 1996: Vega 22.10.96 (Sundance)
- 1996: Take You There (Sundance)

Singles

- 1987: Everyday Seems Like Sunday / Back To You Again (Sound Of Music SOUND 705)
- 1987: The Sharing Patrol In Cb (SAM Records SAM 18) (EP)
- 198?: Day After Yesterday (Sound Of Music SOUND 703)
- 1990: It's Not True / Like A Rolling Stone (EMI 1397627)
- 1994: Yikes! (Instant Records)
- 1996: I Can Take You There (Sundance SU9023-40) (CD single)
- 1996: Santa Claus Is Coming To Town (Sundance (SU9026-40) (CD single)

=== Johnny Sangster & Rob Benson ===
LPs

- 2002: Sangster Meets Benson/Benson Meets Sangster (Roam)
