= Yazid Sabeg =

French businessman

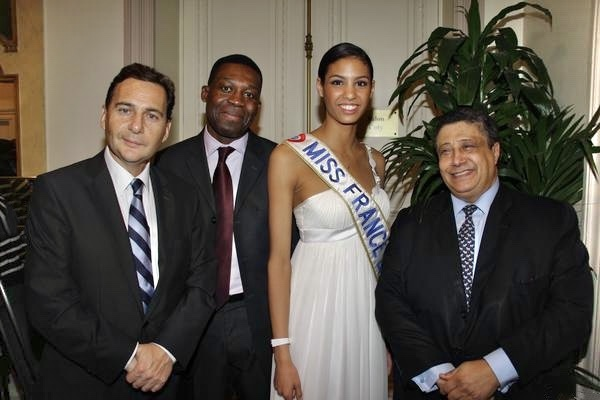
Éric Besson, Patrick Lozès, Chloé Mortaud (Miss France 2009) and Yazid Sabeg at the annual diner of CRAN, February 5, 2009

Yazid Sabeg (born 8 January 1950) is a French businessman. He is the president of the administrative council of the high-technology firm CS Communication and Systems and also a member of the Institute of International and Strategic Relations.

== Early life and education ==
Born in Guelma, Algeria to a docker father, he moved to what was then metropolitan France in 1952, and did his studies at Faidherbe Secondary School in Lille and then at the University of Paris I where he obtained a PhD in economic and social sciences.

== Career ==
Sabeg began his career at a subsidiary of Crédit Lyonnais Bank. In 1990, after an experience in Spie Batignolles, he founded a financial firm thanks to which he took control of the Compagnie des Signaux, known as CS Communication et Systèmes.

His success in the business world, coupled with his Maghrebian origins, have given him a lot of media coverage. Member of the Montaigne Institute, he is close to the UMP. In 2004, he published Discrimination positive, pourquoi la France ne peut y échapper [Positive discrimination, why France cannot escape from it] with his brother Yacine, a journalist.

=== Work for diversity and equality ===
He has been nominated as the "commissaire à l'égalité des chances" in François Fillon government by French president Nicolas Sarkozy on 17 December 2008.

Sabeg warned that France risked becoming an apartheid state unless it brings minorities into the mainstream. "Today we are creating a rift that is leading straight to apartheid", said Sabeg when named commissioner for diversity and equal opportunities. "We cannot allow France to become an apartheid state", he said in an interview to several French media as Barack Obama, the first black American to serve as US president, began his first full day in office.
