= Nicole Forsgren =

American technology executive

- Education: Utah State University, University of Arizona
- Website: https://nicolefv.com/

Nicole Forsgren is an American technology executive, IT impact expert, and author. In 2020, she was named vice president of Research & Strategy at Microsoft's GitHub and, more recently, Partner at Microsoft Research. She coauthored Accelerate: The Science of Lean Software and DevOps, which won the Shingo Research and Professional Publication Award in 2019.

== Education ==
Forsgren holds a Master of Accounting from the University of Arizona’s Eller College of Management and a PhD in Management Information Systems.

== Career ==
In 2020, Forsgren was hired by GitHub as the VP of Research and Strategy. She served as Director of Organizational Performance and Analytics at Chef Software from 2014 to 2015. Towards the end of 2015, she left Chef and, along with Jez Humble and Gene Kim, founded DevOps Research and Assessment LLC (DORA) with Jez Humble and Gene Kim. DORA is known for the annual State of DevOps report, and their DevOps Scorecard. Forsgren served as CEO. In 2018, DORA was purchased by Google.

Forsgren has been an assistant or visiting professor at Boise State University, Pepperdine University, and Utah State University. She is a Research Affiliate at the Social Analytics Institute at Clemson University and Florida International University.

== Selected works ==
- Nicole Forsgren PhD, Jez Humble, Gene Kim. Accelerate. IT Revolution Press. 2018.
- Gene Kim, Jez Humble, Patrick Debois, John Willis, Nicole Forsgren. The DevOps Handbook, Second Edition. IT Revolution Press. 2021
