= DevOps Research and Assessment =

Research team in Google Cloud

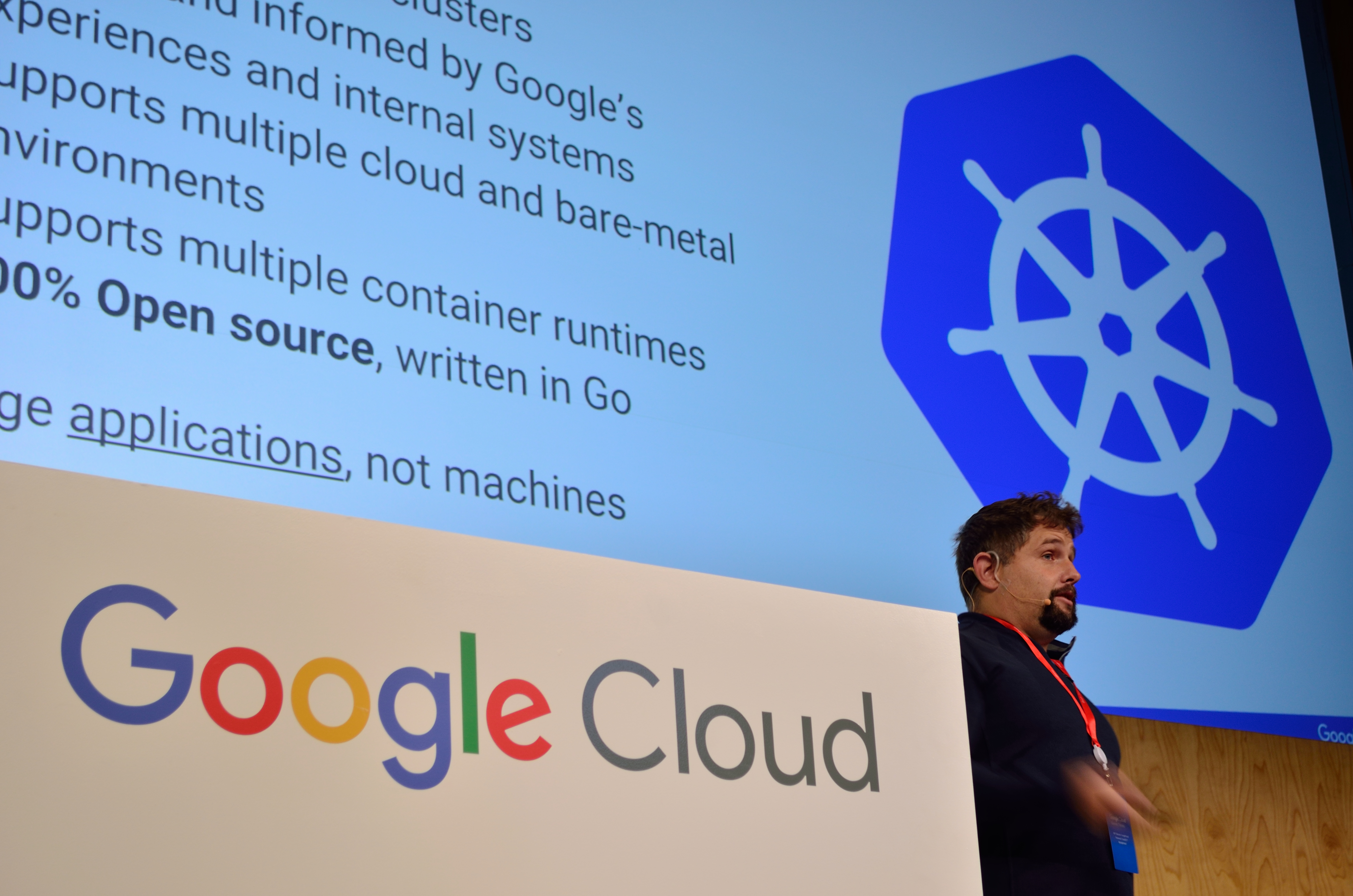
The DORA team are part of Google Cloud

DevOps Research and Assessment (abbreviated to DORA) is a team that is part of Google Cloud that engages in opinion polling of software engineers to conduct research for the DevOps movement.

The DORA team was founded by Nicole Forsgren, Jez Humble and Gene Kim. and conducted research for the DevOps company Puppet and later became an independent team (with Puppet continuing to produce reports by a new team).

Whilst the founding members have departed, the DORA team continue to publish research in the form of annual State of DevOps Reports.

== State of DevOps Reports ==
The DORA team began publishing State of DevOps Reports in 2013. The latest DORA State of DevOps Report, published in 2024, surveyed "more than 39,000 professionals across many industries globally." It found AI is having a broad impact on software development, with largely positive results. "Flow," "productivity," and "job satisfaction" are cited among 8 benefits of AI adoption for software developers. The detrimental effects of AI were "reductions to software delivery performance" and "a reported decrease in time spent doing valuable work."

== DORA Four Key Metrics ==
For the purposes of their research, Four Key Metrics, sometimes referred to as DORA Metrics, are used to assess the performance of teams.

The four metrics are as follows:

- Change Lead Time - Time to implement, test, and deliver code for a feature (measured from first commit to deployment)
- Deployment Frequency - Number of deployments in a given duration of time
- Change Failure Rate - Percentage of failed changes over all changes (regardless of success)
- Mean Time to Recovery (MTTR) - Time it takes to restore service after production failure

Using these performance measures, the team are able to assess how practices (like outsourcing) and risk factors impact performance metrics for an engineering team.

=== Limitations ===
These metrics have been used by organizations to evaluate team-by-team performance, a use-case which the DORA team issued a warning against in October 2023.

Research conducted by the computer scientist Junade Ali and the British polling firm Survation found that both software engineers (when building software systems) and public perception (when using software systems) found other factors mattered significantly more than the outcome measures which were treated as the "Four Key Metrics" (which ultimately measure the speed of resolving issues and the speed of fixing bugs, and are used to create the findings in the book), and risk and reward appetite varies from sector-to-sector.

== Accelerate (book) ==
Accelerate: The Science of Lean Software and DevOps: Building and Scaling High Performing Technology Organizations
- Author: Nicole Forsgren, Jez Humble, Gene Kim
- Language: English
- Subject: DevOps
- Publisher: IT Revolution
- Publication date: 2018
- Publication place: United States
- Pages: 156 (paperback)
- Awards: Shingo Prize
- ISBN: 9781942788331
- OCLC: 1035781633

Accelerate: The Science of Lean Software and DevOps: Building and Scaling High Performing Technology Organizations is a software engineering book co-authored by Nicole Forsgren, Jez Humble and Gene Kim from their time in the DORA team. The book explores how software development teams using Lean Software and DevOps can measure their performance and the performance of software engineering teams impacts the overall performance of an organization.

The book discusses their research conducted as part of the DORA team for the annual State of DevOps Reports. In total, the authors considered 23,000 data points from a variety of companies of various different sizes (from start-up to enterprises), for-profit and not-for-profit and both those with legacy systems and those with modern systems.

=== 24 Key Capabilities ===
The authors outline 24 practices to improve software delivery which they refer to as "key capabilities" and group them into five categories.

==== Continuous Delivery ====
- Use version control for all production artifacts
- Automate your deployment process
- Implement Continuous Integration
- Use trunk-based development methods
- Implement test automation
- Support test data management
- Shift Left on Security
- Implement Continuous Delivery (CD)

==== Architecture ====
- Use a Loosely Coupled Architecture
- Architect for Empowered Teams

==== Product and Process ====
- Gather and Implement Customer Feedback
- Make the Flow of Work Visible through the Value Stream
- Work in Small Batches
- Foster and Enable Team Experimentation

==== Lean Management and Monitoring ====
- Have a Lightweight Change Approval Processes
- Monitor across Application and Infrastructure to Inform Business Decisions
- Check System Health Proactively
- Improve Processes and Manage Work with Work-In-Process (WIP) Limits
- Visualize Work to Monitor Quality and Communicate throughout the Team

==== Cultural ====
- Support a Generative Culture
- Encourage and Support Learning
- Support and Facilitate Collaboration among Teams
- Provide Resources and Tools that Make Work Meaningful
- Support or Embody Transformational Leadership
