= Samhain (software) =

Security software

- Developer: Samhain Services
- Stable release: 4.5.3 / October 31, 2025; 11 months ago
- Written in: C
- Operating system: Linux, all POSIX/UNIX Systems, Microsoft Windows
- Type: Security, Monitoring, HIDS
- License: GNU General Public License
- Website: la-samhna.de/samhain

Samhain is an integrity checker and host intrusion detection system that can be used on single hosts as well as large, UNIX-based networks. It supports central monitoring as well as powerful (and new) stealth features to run undetected in memory, using steganography.

== Main features ==
- Complete integrity check
  - uses cryptographic checksums of files to detect modifications,
  - can find rogue SUID executables anywhere on a disk, and
- Centralized monitoring
  - native support for logging to a central server via encrypted and authenticated connections
- Tamper resistance
  - database and configuration files can be signed
  - log file entries and e-mail reports are signed
  - support for stealth operation

== See also ==
- Host-based intrusion detection system comparison
