= Intrusion Detection Message Exchange Format =

Used as part of computer security, IDMEF (Intrusion Detection Message Exchange Format) is a data format used to exchange information between software enabling intrusion detection, intrusion prevention, security information collection and management systems that may need to interact with them. IDMEF messages are designed to be processed automatically. The details of the format are described in the RFC 4765. This RFC presents an implementation of the XML data model and the associated DTD. The requirements for this format are described in RFC 4766, and the recommended transport protocol (IDXP) is documented in RFC 4767

== IDMEFv2 ==
An update of the IDMEFv1 format is being specified as an Internet Draft at IETF since 2022. A final experimental version is awaited for 2027. This new version is extended to all type of incidents, cyber, physical and natural hazards.

== IDMEF ==
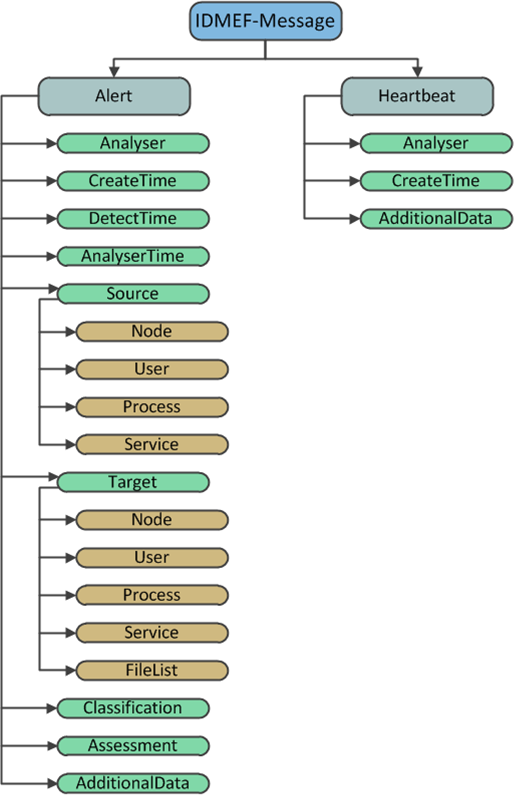

The purpose of IDMEF is to define data formats and exchange procedures for sharing information of interest to intrusion detection and response systems and to the management systems that may need to interact with them. It is used in computer security for incidents reporting and exchanging. It is intended for easy automatic processing.

IDMEF is a well-structured object-oriented format, which consists of 33 classes containing 108 fields, including three mandatory:

- The classification
- The unique login
- The date of creation of the alert.

There are currently two types of IDMEF messages that can be created, Heartbeat or Alert

== Heartbeat ==
The Heartbeats are sent by the analyzers to indicate their status. These messages are sent at regular intervals which period is defined in the Heartbeat Interval Field. If none of these messages are received for several periods of time, consider that this analyzer is not able to trigger alerts.

== Alert ==
Alerts are used to describe an attack that took place, the main areas that create the alert are:

- CreateTime: Date of creation of the alert
- DetectTime: alert detection time by the analyzer
- AnalyzerTime: The time the alert was sent by the analyzer
- Source: Details about the origin of the attack can be a service, a user, a process and / or a node
- Target: Details on the target of the attack can be a service, a user, a process and / or a node and a file
- Classification: Name of the attack and references, as CVEs
- Assessment: Evaluation of the attack (severity, potential impact, etc.)
- AdditionalData: Additional information on the attack

There are three other alert types that inherit from this scheme:

- CorrelationAlert: Grouping of alerts related to one another
- ToolAlert: alerts from the same Grouping tool
- OverflowAlert: Alert resulting from attack so-called buffer overflow

== Example ==
IDMEF report of ping of death attack can look as follows:

<?xml version="1.0" encoding="UTF-8"?>
<idmef:IDMEF-Message xmlns:idmef="http://iana.org/idmef" version="1.0">
  <idmef:Alert messageid="abc123456789">
    <idmef:Analyzer analyzerid="bc-sensor01">
      <idmef:Node category="dns">
        <idmef:name>sensor.example.com</idmef:name>
      </idmef:Node>
    </idmef:Analyzer>
    <idmef:CreateTime ntpstamp="0xbc71f4f5.0xef449129">2000-03-09T10:01:25.93464Z</idmef:CreateTime>
    <idmef:Source ident="a1a2" spoofed="yes">
      <idmef:Node ident="a1a2-1">
        <idmef:Address ident="a1a2-2" category="ipv4-addr">
          <idmef:address>192.0.2.200</idmef:address>
        </idmef:Address>
      </idmef:Node>
    </idmef:Source>
    <idmef:Target ident="b3b4">
      <idmef:Node>
        <idmef:Address ident="b3b4-1" category="ipv4-addr">
          <idmef:address>192.0.2.50</idmef:address>
        </idmef:Address>
      </idmef:Node>
    </idmef:Target>
    <idmef:Target ident="c5c6">
      <idmef:Node ident="c5c6-1" category="nisplus">
        <idmef:name>lollipop</idmef:name>
      </idmef:Node>
    </idmef:Target>
    <idmef:Target ident="d7d8">
      <idmef:Node ident="d7d8-1">
        <idmef:location>Cabinet B10</idmef:location>
        <idmef:name>Cisco.router.b10</idmef:name>
      </idmef:Node>
    </idmef:Target>
    <idmef:Classification text="Ping-of-death detected">
      <idmef:Reference origin="cve">
        <idmef:name>CVE-1999-128</idmef:name>
        <idmef:url>http://www.cve.mitre.org/cgi-bin/cvename.cgi?name=CVE-1999-128</idmef:url>
      </idmef:Reference>
    </idmef:Classification>
  </idmef:Alert>
</idmef:IDMEF-Message>

== Tools implementing the IDMEF V1protocol ==
- Prelude OSS (Intrusion Detection System)
- NIDS Snort
- NIDS Suricata ()
- HIDS Ossec ()
- HIDS Samhain ()
- Sagan
- Barnyard 2
- Orchids
- LibPrelude : Part of the Prelude OSS Project, libprelude permits to communicate between agents using the IDMEF format. Libprelude is coded in C but multiple bindings are available (Python, Lua, Perl, etc.). It can be used in any open-source IDS tools.
- LibIDMEF : LibIDMEF is an implementation of the IETF (Internet Engineering Task Force), IDWG ( Intrusion Detection Exchange Format Charter Working Group), draft standard IDMEF protocol.
- IDMEF Framework Dotnet : Dotnet library to create IDMEF objects and export them in XML.
- DILCA – Distributed IDMEF Logical Correlation Architecture : DILCA is a distributed logical correlation and reaction architecture featuring collection and correlation of IDMEF formatted log events (Intrusion Detection Message Exchange Format – RFC 4765) through a multi-step signature based system.
- XML::IDMEF – A Perl module for building/parsing IDMEF messages : IDMEF.pm is an interface for simply creating and parsing IDMEF messages. IDMEF is an XML based protocol designed mainly for representing Intrusion Detection (IDS) alert messages.
- Other module for creating/parsing IDMEF messages
- Snort IDMEF Plugin : Snort IDMEF is an IDMEF XML plugin for Snort to output alert events in the form of IDMEF messages. The plugin is compatible with Snort 2.x
- A Broccoli server to send IDMEF alerts via Prelude
- Converter for the IDMEF format
- IDMEF Parser
- An IDMEF alerting library for distributed IDPS

== Competing frameworks ==
Many telecommunications network elements produce security alarms that address intrusion detection in conformance with international standards. These security alarms are inserted into the normal alarm stream, where they can be seen and acted upon immediately by personnel in a network operations center.
