= Suricata (software) =

Open-source network analysis and threat detection software

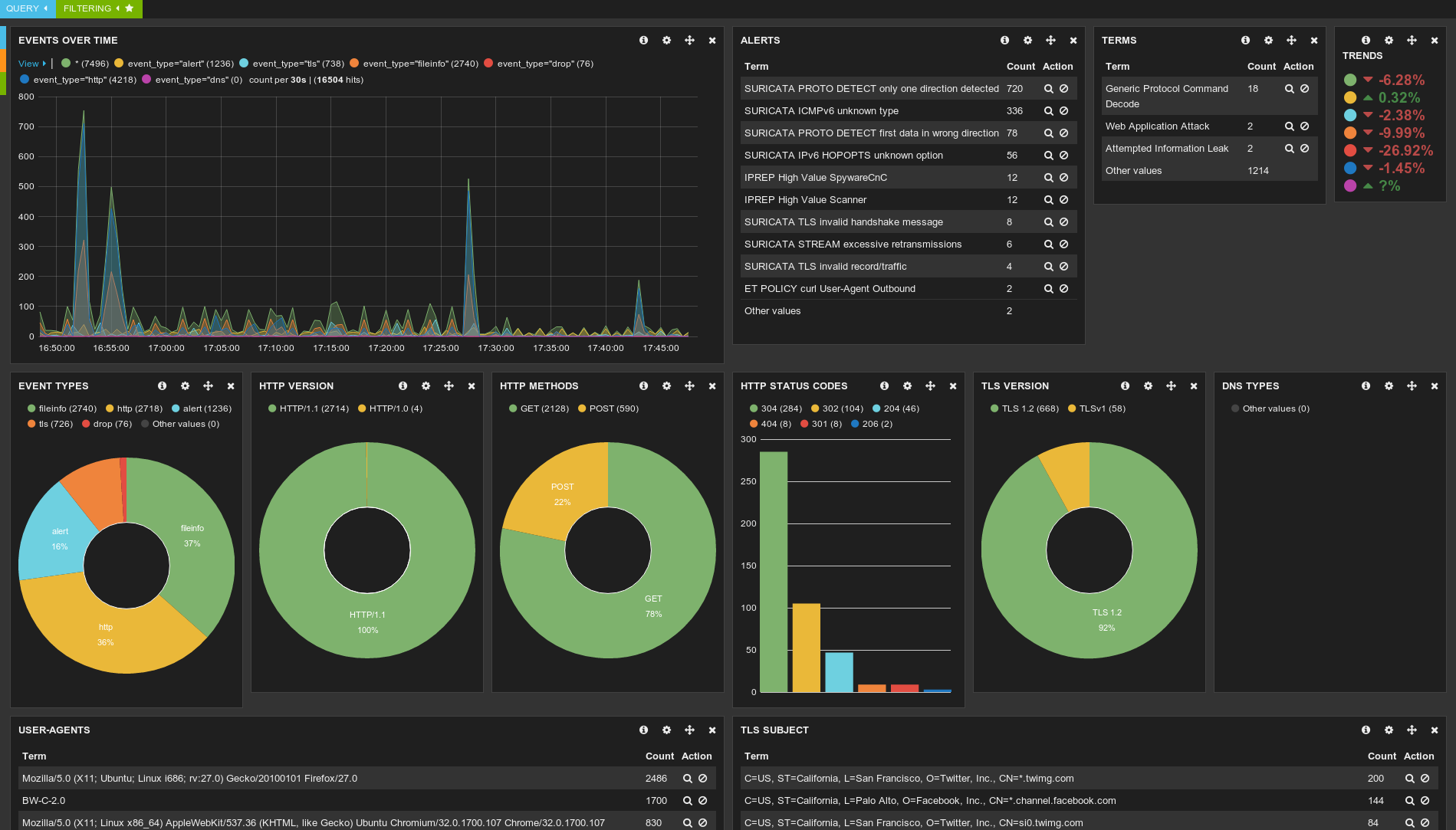
- Developer: Open Information Security Foundation
- Stable release: 8.0.7 / 15 September 2026; 1 day ago
- Written in: C, Rust
- Operating system: FreeBSD, Linux, UNIX, Mac OS X, Microsoft Windows
- Type: Intrusion-detection system; Intrusion prevention system
- License: GNU General Public License
- Website: suricata.io
- Repository: github.com/OISF/suricata

Suricata is open-source network analysis and threat detection software. The features include intrusion detection and prevention as well as network transaction logging and file extraction. It was developed by the Open Information Security Foundation (OISF). The first standard release was in July 2010.

== Features ==
=== IDS and IPS ===
Suricata provides threat detection capabilities. In IDS mode, it is going to analyse the traffic and generate an alert when a signature matches.

In IPS mode, it acts like a firewall. It provides traffic filtering and monitoring and allows network administrators to write and enforce detection rules.

Suricata is able to detect common attack vectors such as port scanning, denial-of-service, pass-the-hash, and brute-force attacks.

=== Network monitoring ===
Suricata can be used to monitor network traffic in real time. It can log various types of network transactions, including HTTP, DNS, SMB and TLS sessions.

=== File extraction ===
Suricata can extract files from network traffic to disk for further analysis. It supports extraction over protocols such as FTP, HTTP, SMTP and SMB. It can also perform file type identification or hash computation of the files seen on the network without extracting them to disk.

=== PCAP logging ===
Suricata can log network traffic in PCAP format for later analysis with tools such as Wireshark. It also supports conditional pcap logging where only the traffic of flow where a rule matched is logged.

=== Event Format ===
Suricata logs events in the JSON format, which can be easily parsed and analyzed by other tools.

== Release cycle ==
Typically, a major update of Suricata is released every 2 years.

== Ruleset ==
Suricata uses a ruleset to perform detection and threat analysis. This ruleset is composed of signatures that define which behaviors on the network should trigger an alert event. The ruleset is usually constituted of signatures of various severity. Some are designed to alert on Common Vulnerabilities and Exposures exploitation and some are just there to select interesting events (like a software update) that could be meaningful during an investigation.

== See also ==
- Aanval
- Snort
