= Tripwire (company) =

American software company

Tripwire, Inc.
- Type: Subsidiary
- Founded: 1997
- Headquarters: Block 300; Portland, Oregon; United States
- Revenue: US$86.2 million (2010)
- Net income: $4 million (2010)
- Owner: Fortra
- Number of employees: ▲400 (2013)
- Website: tripwire.com

Tripwire, Inc. is a software company based in Portland, Oregon, that focuses on security and compliance automation. It is a subsidiary of technology company Fortra.

== History ==
Tripwire's intrusion detection software was created in the 1990s by Purdue University graduate student Gene Kim and his professor Gene Spafford. In 1997, Gene Kim co-founded Tripwire, Inc. with rights to the Tripwire name and technology, and produced a commercial version, Tripwire for Servers.

In 2000, Tripwire released Open Source Tripwire.

In 2005, the firm released Tripwire Enterprise, a product for configuration control by detecting, assessing, reporting and remediating file and configuration changes. In January 2010, it announced the release of Tripwire Log Center, a log and security information and event management (SIEM) software that stores, correlates and reports log and security event data. The two products can be integrated to enable correlation of change and event data. August 21, 2009, the firm acquired Activeworx technologies from CrossTec Corporation.

Revenues grew to $74 million in 2009. In October 2009, the company had 261 employees; that number grew to 336 by June 2010.

By May–June 2010, the company had over 5,500 customers and had announced that it had filed a registration statement with the Securities and Exchange Commission for a proposed initial public offering of its common stock. A year later, the company announced its sale to the private equity firm Thoma Bravo, ending its $86 million IPO plans. CEO Jim Johnson cited the firm's failure to reach the $100 million revenue milestone in 2010 as well as changing IPO market expectations as reasons for not going through with the IPO. The day following the acquisition, the company laid off about 50 of its 350 employees.

Tripwire acquired nCircle, which focused on asset discovery and vulnerability management, in 2013.

In December 2014, Belden announced plans to buy Tripwire for $710 million. The acquisition was completed on January 2, 2015. In February 2022, Belden announced to sell Tripwire to HelpSystems (HelpSystems was renamed Fortra later that year).
