= Snort (software) =

Open-source intrusion prevention system

- Developer: Cisco Systems
Stable release
- Snort 2.x (Legacy): 2.9.19.0 / December 6, 2021; 4 years ago
- Snort 3.x: 3.12.2.0 / April 23, 2026; 36 days ago
- Written in: C++ (since version 3.0), C
- Operating system: cross-platform: Unix-like (Linux, BSD, macOS), Windows
- Platform: IA-32, x86-64
- Type: Intrusion detection and prevention
- License: GPLv2+
- Website: www.snort.org
- Repository: github.com/snort3/snort3

Snort is a network intrusion detection system (IDS) and intrusion prevention system (IPS) created in 1998 by Martin Roesch, founder and former CTO of Sourcefire. Snort is now developed by Cisco, which purchased Sourcefire in 2013. It is free and open-source software with a GNU General Public License version 2.

In 2009, Snort entered InfoWorld's Open Source Hall of Fame as one of the "greatest [pieces of] open source software of all time".

== Uses ==
Snort's open-source network-based intrusion detection/prevention system (IDS/IPS) has the ability to perform real-time traffic analysis and packet logging on Internet Protocol (IP) networks. Snort performs protocol analysis, content searching and matching.

The program can also be used to detect probes or attacks, including, but not limited to, operating system fingerprinting attempts, semantic URL attacks, buffer overflows, server message block probes, and stealth port scans.

Snort can be configured in three main modes: 1. sniffer, 2. packet logger, and 3. network intrusion detection.

=== Sniffer Mode ===
The program will read network packets and display them on the console.

=== Packet Logger Mode ===
In packet logger mode, the program will log packets to the disk.

=== Network Intrusion Detection System Mode ===
In intrusion detection mode, the program will monitor network traffic and analyze it against a rule set defined by the user. The program will then perform a specific action based on what has been identified.

== Third-party tools ==
There are several third-party tools interfacing Snort for administration, reporting, performance and log analysis:

- Snorby – a GPLv3 Ruby on Rails application
- BASE
- Sguil (free)

== See also ==
- List of free and open-source software packages
- Sigma (signature format)
- Suricata (software)
- YARA
- Zeek
