= Elias Levy =

Computer security businessman

Elias Levy (also known as Aleph One) is a computer scientist from Venezuela. He was the moderator of "Bugtraq", a full disclosure vulnerability mailing list, from May 14, 1996 until October 15, 2001.

He was the CTO and co-founder of the computer security company SecurityFocus, which was acquired by Symantec on August 6, 2002. He is also known as the author of the article "Smashing The Stack For Fun and Profit", published in 1996 Phrack magazine issue 49, which was the first high-quality, public, step-by-step introduction to stack buffer overflow vulnerabilities and their exploitation.

After the sale of SecurityFocus to Symantec in August 2002, Levy was accused by many of "selling out" and compromising the high principles of the Bugtraq list. The Full-Disclosure mailing list was founded in part as a protest against the sale.
