= Kippo =

Medium-interaction SSH honeypot

Kippo is a medium-interaction SSH honeypot written in Python. Kippo is used to log brute-force attacks and the entire shell interaction performed by an attacker. It is inspired by Kojoney. The source code is released under the New BSD License.

Kippo is no longer under active development and recommends using the fork'd project Cowrie.

== Python dependencies ==
- Python Twisted
- Twisted Conch
- Python 2.5+ but less than 3.0
- Python-dev
- Pysan1
- Python-OpenSSL
- PyCrypto
- MySql Python
