= Full Disclosure (mailing list) =

Full Disclosure is a "lightly moderated" security mailing list generally used for discussion about information security and disclosure of vulnerabilities. The list was created on July 9, 2002, by Len Rose and also administered by him, who later handed it off to John Cartwright. After Len Rose shut down netsys.com, the list was hosted and sponsored by Secunia.

The Full Disclosure mailing list was originally created because many people felt that the Bugtraq mailing list had "changed for the worse".

In March 2014 Cartwright shutdown the original Full-Disclosure mailing list because an "unnamed" security researcher made requests for large-scale deletion of information and threatened legal action. Cartwright wrote on the list's homepage, "I always assumed that the turning point would be a sweeping request for large-scale deletion of information that some vendor or other had taken exception to. I never imagined that request might come from a researcher within the 'community' itself."

On March 25, 2014, the list was "rebooted" by Fyodor. The site is now part of seclists.org and no longer associated with grok.org.uk.

== Notable 0-days first disclosed in Full Disclosure ==
Email subject	Software	Date	Ref.
Defense in depth -- the Microsoft way (part 14): incomplete, misleading and dangerous documentation	Windows NT	2013-11-24	
Defense in depth -- the Microsoft way (part 11): privilege escalation for dummies	Windows NT	2013-10-02	
The history of a -probably- 13 years old Oracle bug: TNS Poison	Oracle Database	2012-04-18	
Apache Killer	Apache HTTP Server	2011-08-26	
Microsoft Windows Help Centre Handles Malformed Escape Sequences Incorrectly	Help and Support Center	2010-06-10	
Microsoft Windows NT #GP Trap Handler Allows Users to Switch Kernel Stack	Windows NT	2010-01-19	
