= SecurityFocus =

Computer security portal and mailing list host

- Website type: Computer security portal
- Available in: English
- Owner: Jonathan Brossard (since 2026)
- Creators: Oliver Friedrichs, Alfred Huger, Arthur Wong
- Website: www.securityfocus.com
- Commercial: No
- Registration: Optional
- Launched: 1999; 27 years ago
- Current status: Active

SecurityFocus is an online computer security portal and host of the Bugtraq mailing list. Founded in 1999 by Oliver Friedrichs, Alfred Huger, and Arthur Wong, the site served as a hub for vulnerability disclosure, security news, and community discussion. It maintained the Bugtraq ID (BID) vulnerability database, one of the most widely referenced sources in the CVE ecosystem.

SecurityFocus columnists and writers included former Department of Justice cybercrime prosecutor Mark Rasch and hacker-turned-journalist Kevin Poulsen.

== History ==
SecurityFocus was established in 1999 in San Mateo, California. Elias Levy, who had moderated the Bugtraq mailing list since 1996, served as co-founder and chief technology officer. In July 1999, the Bugtraq mailing list was transferred to SecurityFocus from the Brown University NetSpace Project. The site also launched the BID vulnerability database and the DeepSight threat management service, which provided early-warning intelligence to enterprise clients.

On August 6, 2002, Symantec completed its acquisition of SecurityFocus. Under Symantec, the news portal content was gradually migrated to Symantec's own platforms. The Bugtraq mailing list and BID database continued to operate, though the BID database stopped being publicly updated on July 26, 2019.

In August 2019, Broadcom acquired Symantec's enterprise security business. On April 30, 2020, Accenture Security completed its acquisition of Symantec's Cybersecurity Services, which included SecurityFocus.

On August 6, 2026, Jonathan Brossard announced the acquisition of SecurityFocus and the Bugtraq name, describing the project as community-driven: "We are providing the platform. The community decides what it becomes." The relaunch was announced at DEF CON 34 in Las Vegas, and the Bugtraq mailing list resumed operation as an independently run, community-driven platform. Alongside the original Bugtraq list, SecurityFocus launched a second list dedicated to AI security research and formal proofs, reachable at bugtraq@bugtraq.ai. DEF CON founder Jeff Moss publicly welcomed the relaunch on the mailing list.

== See also ==
- Bugtraq
- Full disclosure (computer security)
- Common Vulnerabilities and Exposures
