= Mark Rasch =

Lawyer (born 1958)

- Born: August 2, 1958 (age 68); Rochester, New York, U.S.
- Education: State University of New York at Albany, University of Buffalo Law School
- Occupation: Lawyer

Mark D. Rasch (born August 2, 1958) is an American attorney and author, working in the areas of corporate and government cybersecurity, privacy and incident response. He is the former Chief Security Evangelist for Verizon Communications after having been Vice President, Deputy General Counsel, and Chief Privacy and Data Security Officer for SAIC. From 1983 to 1992, Rasch worked at the U.S. Department of Justice within the Criminal Division's Fraud Section. Rasch earned a J.D. in 1983 from State University of New York at Buffalo and is a 1976 graduate of the Bronx High School of Science.

He prosecuted Robert Tappan Morris in the case of United States v. Morris (1991). He was an amicus curiae related to data encryption in Bernstein v. United States, and prosecuted presidential candidate Lyndon LaRouche, and organized crime figures in New York associated with the Gambino crime family He also helped uncover the individual responsible for the so-called "Craigslist murder" in Boston. He also represented a Georgia Tech security researcher in connection with the investigation by John Durham which led to the indictment and later acquittal of former DNC outside counsel Michael Sussman, and represents Tampa, Florida journalist Timothy Burke in connection with a criminal prosecution for publishing materials about former Fox News host Tucker Carlson's interview with Kanye West published on Vice News.

In May 2025, U.S. District Judge Kathryn Kimball Mizelle ordered a motion filed by Rasch and co-counsel Michael Maddux in the Burke case to be struck from the record, describing it as containing "unprofessional misrepresentations of legal citations." Rasch subsequently told the court that the errors resulted from his use of a premium version of ChatGPT and an AI-powered Thomson Reuters legal tool, and took responsibility for the filing.

Rasch is legal counsel to computer security and threat intelligence firm Unit 221B, and speaks regularly at the COSAC conference in Naas, Ireland on topics related to computer security, threat intelligence, and Artificial Intelligence. The incident, in which the filing was found to include nonexistent quotes and misstatements of law, was also reported by the Tampa Bay Times.

Rasch is a regular contributor to Security Boulevard, and contributed to Security Current and SecurityFocus and on issues related to law and technology and is a regular contributor to Wired Magazine. He was also a longtime columnist for Storefront Backtalk, a now-defunct publication that tracked global retail technology. He has appeared on or been quoted by MSNBC, Fox News, The New York Times, Forbes, PBS, The Washington Post, NPR and other national and international media.

== Books ==
- Rasch, Mark (1999). Lawyers and the Internet. Sequoia Professional Development Corp.
- Rasch, Mark (1996). The Internet and Business: A Lawyer's Guide to the Emerging Legal Issues. Computer Law Association. ISBN 978-1-885169-05-1.
