= Gordon Lyon =

American network security expert (born 1977)

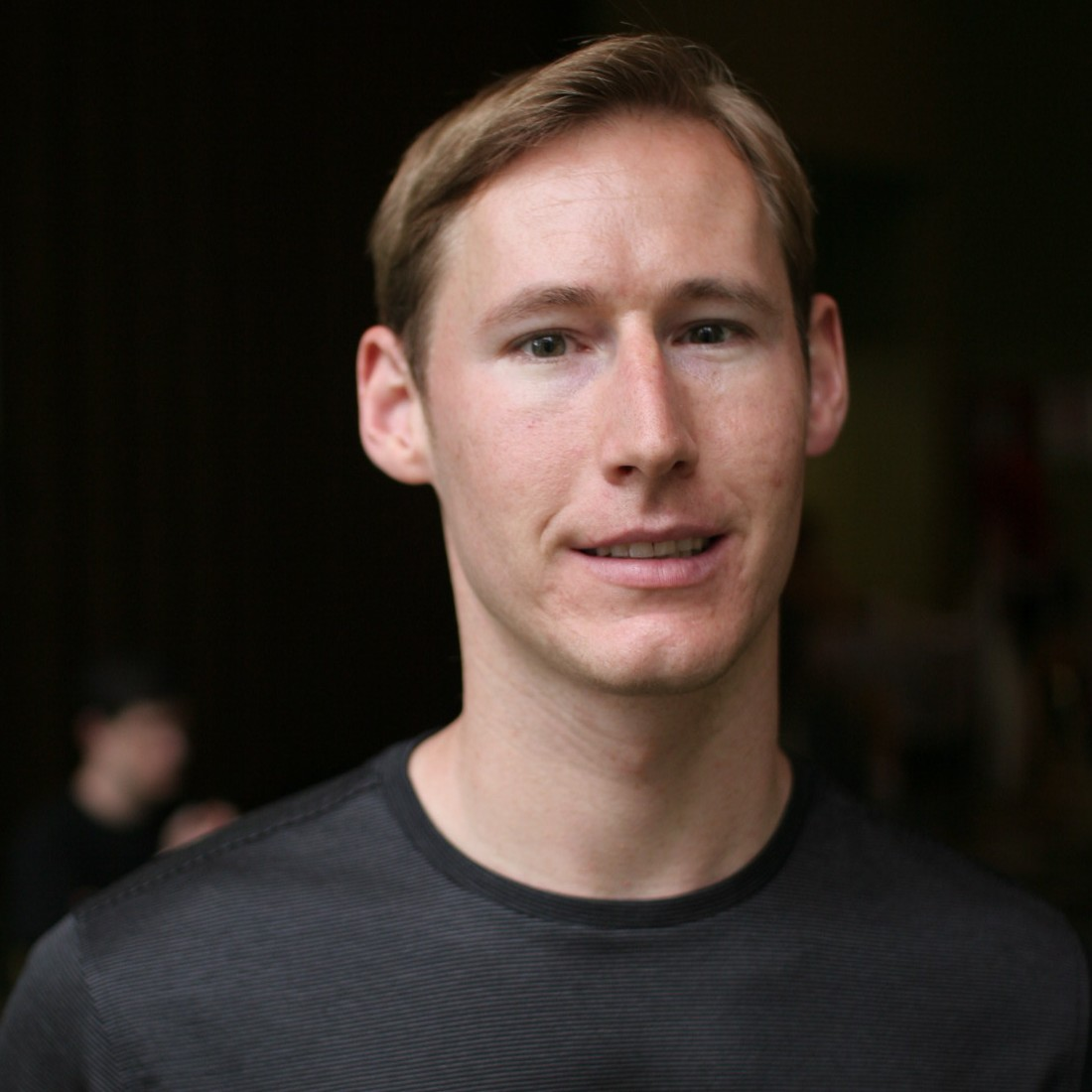
- Lyon at the Hackers On Planet Earth (HOPE) number 6 conference in 2006
- Born: 1977 (age 48–49)
- Other name: Fyodor Vaskovich
- Known for: Nmap
- Website: insecure.org/fyodor

Gordon Lyon (also known by his pseudonym Fyodor Vaskovich) is an American network security expert, creator of Nmap and author of books, websites, and technical papers about network security. He is a founding member of the Honeynet Project and was Vice President of Computer Professionals for Social Responsibility.

== Personal life ==
Lyon has been active in the network security community since the mid-1990s. His handle, "Fyodor", was taken from Russian author Fyodor Dostoyevsky. Most of his programming is done in the C, C++, and Perl programming languages.

== Opposition to grayware ==
In December 2011, Lyon published a post criticizing the fact that Download.com started bundling grayware with their installation managers and expressing concerns users confusing Download.com-offered content for software offered by original authors; he accused them of using deception as well as copyright and trademark violation.

== Conferences ==
Lyon has presented at DEFCON, CanSecWest, FOSDEM, IT Security World, Security Masters' Dojo, ShmooCon, IT-Defense, SFOBug, and other security conferences.

== Websites ==
Lyon maintains several network security web sites:

- Nmap.Org – Host of the Nmap security scanner and its documentation
- SecTools.Org – The top 100 network security tools (ranked by thousands of Nmap users)
- SecLists.Org – Archive of the most common security mailing lists
- Insecure.Org – His main site, offering security news/updates, exploit world archive, and other misc. security resources

== Published books ==
- Know Your Enemy: Revealing the Security Tools, Tactics, and Motives of the Blackhat Community, co-authored with other members of the Honeynet Project.
- Stealing the Network: How to Own a Continent, co-authored with Kevin Mitnick and other hackers.
- Nmap Network Scanning

== See also ==
- W00w00
