= Niels Provos =

German-American computer scientist and software engineer

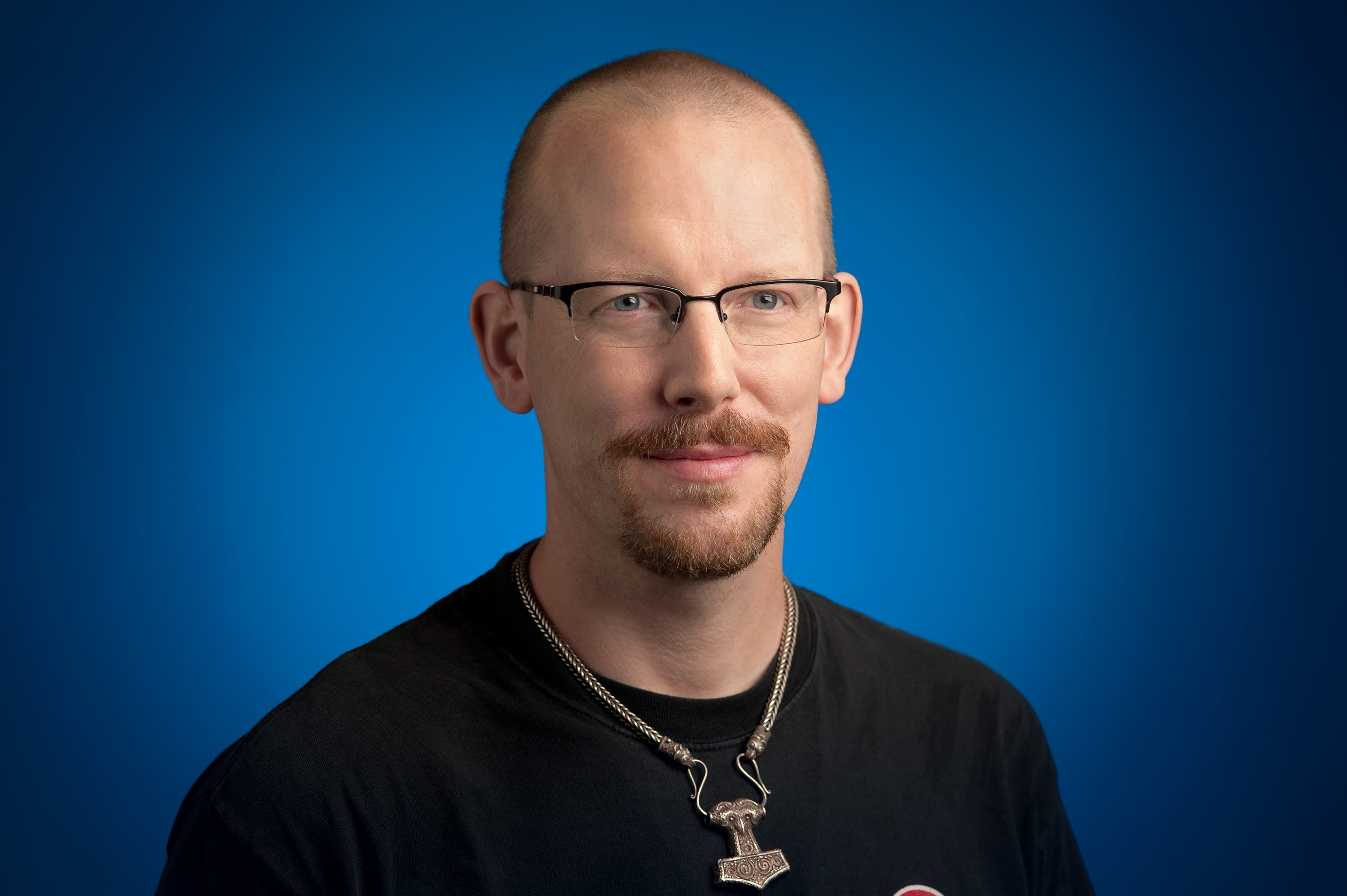
- Education: Universität Hamburg, M.S Mathematics (1998); University of Michigan, Ph.D. Computer Science (2003)
- Known for: OutGuess, OpenBSD, OpenSSH, Bcrypt, Safe Browsing
- Scientific career
- Fields: Computer Security
- Workplaces: Google; Stripe
- Doctoral advisor: Peter Honeyman

Niels Provos is a German-American researcher in security engineering, malware, and cryptography. He received a PhD in computer science from the University of Michigan. From 2003 to 2018, he worked at Google as a Distinguished Engineer on security for Google. In 2018, he left Google to join Stripe as its new head of security. In 2022, Provos left Stripe and joined Lacework as head of Security Efficacy.

For many years, Provos contributed to the OpenBSD operating system, where he developed the bcrypt adaptive cryptographic hash function. He is the author of numerous software packages, including the libevent event driven programming system, the Systrace access control system, the honeyd honeypot system, the StegDetect steganography detector, and many others.

Provos has been an outspoken critic of the effect of the DMCA and similar laws on security researchers, arguing that they threaten to make criminals of people conducting legitimate security research.

Provos has also served as the Program Chair of the Usenix Security Symposium, on the program committees of the Network and Distributed System Security Symposium, ACM SIGCOMM, and numerous other conferences, and served on the board of directors of Usenix from 2006 to 2010.

Blending his professional interests and creative pursuits, Provos has also started producing security-themed Electronic Dance Music (EDM) tracks under his artist name Activ8te. He embarked on this musical endeavor with the aim of garnering more interest in the field of security.

Provos's hobbies also include swordsmithing, and he has forged swords in both Japanese and Viking styles. It started with his father collecting sabres. Niels routinely posts videos of his blacksmithing activities online. By his words "At work, we try to fight the bad guys and make the world safer for our users. And swords are maybe an expression in a similar way. You create weapons to defend yourself against the hordes of barbarians."

In 1999, Provos was the original developer of the steganographic software OutGuess.

== Education ==
- Ph.D., Computer Science & Engineering, August 2003, the University of Michigan (Dissertation: "Statistical Steganalysis")
- Diplom in Mathematics, August 1998, Universität Hamburg, Hamburg, Germany. (Masters in Mathematics). (Thesis: "Cryptography, especially the RSA algorithm on elliptic curves and Z/nZ")
- Vordiplom in Mathematics, March 1995, Universität Hamburg, Hamburg, Germany.
- Vordiplom in Physics, March 1995, Universität Hamburg, Hamburg, Germany.

== Selected publications ==
- All Your iFrames Point to Us Niels Provos, Panayiotis Mavrommatis, Moheeb Rajab and Fabian Monrose, 17th USENIX Security Symposium, August 2008.
- The Ghost in the Browser: Analysis of Web-based Malware Niels Provos, Dean McNamee, Panayiotis Mavrommatis, Ke Wang, and Nagendra Modadugu, USENIX Workshop on Hot Topics in Understanding Botnets, April 2007.
- Detecting Steganographic Content on the Internet Niels Provos and Peter Honeyman, ISOC NDSS'02, San Diego, CA, February 2002
- Improving Host Security with System Call Policies Niels Provos, 12th USENIX Security Symposium, Washington, DC, August 2003
- Provos, Niels; Holz, Thorsten (July 2007). Virtual Honeypots: From Botnet Tracking to Intrusion Detection. Addison-Wesley Professional. ISBN 978-0-321-33632-3.
- Detecting pirated applications (Oct 2014) Ashish Bhatia, Min Gyung Kang, Monirul Islam Sharif, Niels Provos, Panayiotis Mavrommatis, and Sruthi Bandhakavi
