= FOSDEM =

Annual software engineering conference

Free and Open source Software Developers' European Meeting
- Genre: Software engineering conference
- Venue: Campus Solbosch of the Université Libre de Bruxelles (ULB), Brussels
- Country: Belgium
- Inaugurated: 2000 (as OSDEM); 2001 (as FOSDEM)
- Previous event: 31 January - 1 February 2026
- Website: fosdem.org

Free and Open source Software Developers' European Meeting (FOSDEM) is an annual software engineering conference. It is non-commercial and volunteer-organized with a focus on free and open-source software. Initiated in 2000, it is usually held during the first weekend of February, at the Campus Solbosch of the Université libre de Bruxelles (ULB) in the southeast of Brussels, Belgium.

Richard (RichiH) Hartmann and Basti Schubert explain the organization of FOSDEM with free software, 02/2023.

== History ==
FOSDEM was started in 2000 under the name Open Source Developers of Europe Meeting (OSDEM) by Raphael Bauduin. Bauduin said that since he felt he lacked the brains to properly contribute to the open-source community, he wanted to contribute by launching a European event in Brussels. Bauduin teamed up with Damien Sandras. The team repeated the event. The F (of FOSDEM) was added at the request of Richard Stallman.

The Free Software Foundation's ceremony for the Award for the Advancement of Free Software was held at FOSDEM from 2002 to 2006 (for the awards for 2001 to 2005).

The event has been held annually in February since then, with growing numbers of visitors, talks and tracks. It is organized thanks to the help of many volunteers.

The conference attracted about 4,000 visitors as of 2011. By 2013 this grew to 5,000 attendees. Since 2017, FOSDEM attendance is estimated at over 8,000 visitors.

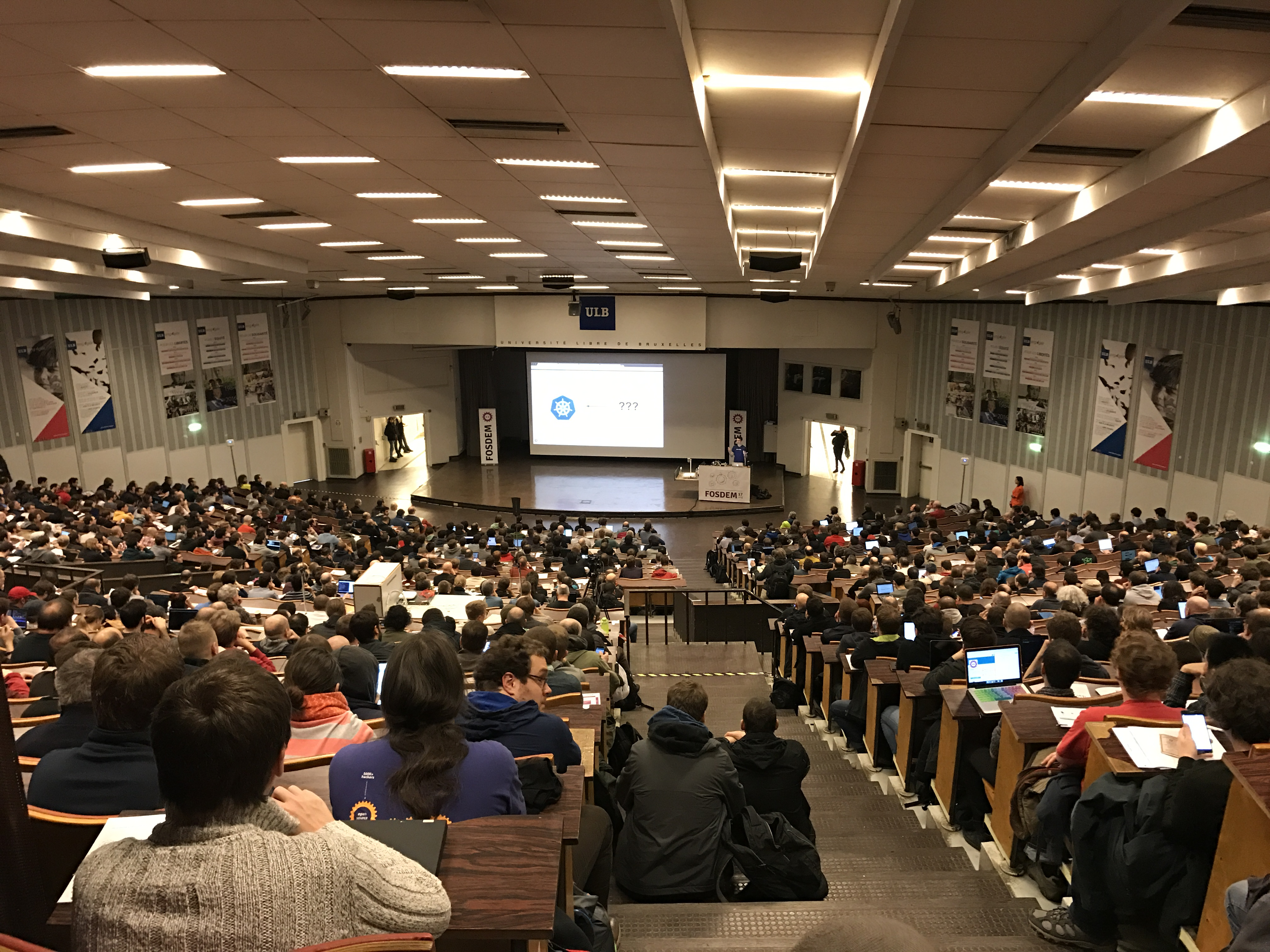
FOSDEM 2017

Due to the COVID-19 pandemic, FOSDEM 2021 and 2022 were held entirely online.

In the following editions (2023 to 2025) of FOSDEM the main structure comprised keynotes, main tracks, developer rooms, lightning talks, stands and Birds Of a Feather (BOF, which is a freer format spread over 3 different rooms). As in previous editions, the activities were held at the Université Libre de Bruxelles using a total of 35 rooms.

=== FOSDEM 2023 ===
It was organised again in Brussels, celebrating 25 years of open source, with a total of 787 speakers spread over 781 events, and 63 tracks. Beyond the core activities FOSDEM also organised the FOSDEM Fringe as a set of independent events also related to free and open source. The number of attends was about 8000 for this edition, the two external keynotes speakers of this edition came from the Linux Foundation and NASA open source.

=== FOSDEM 2024 ===
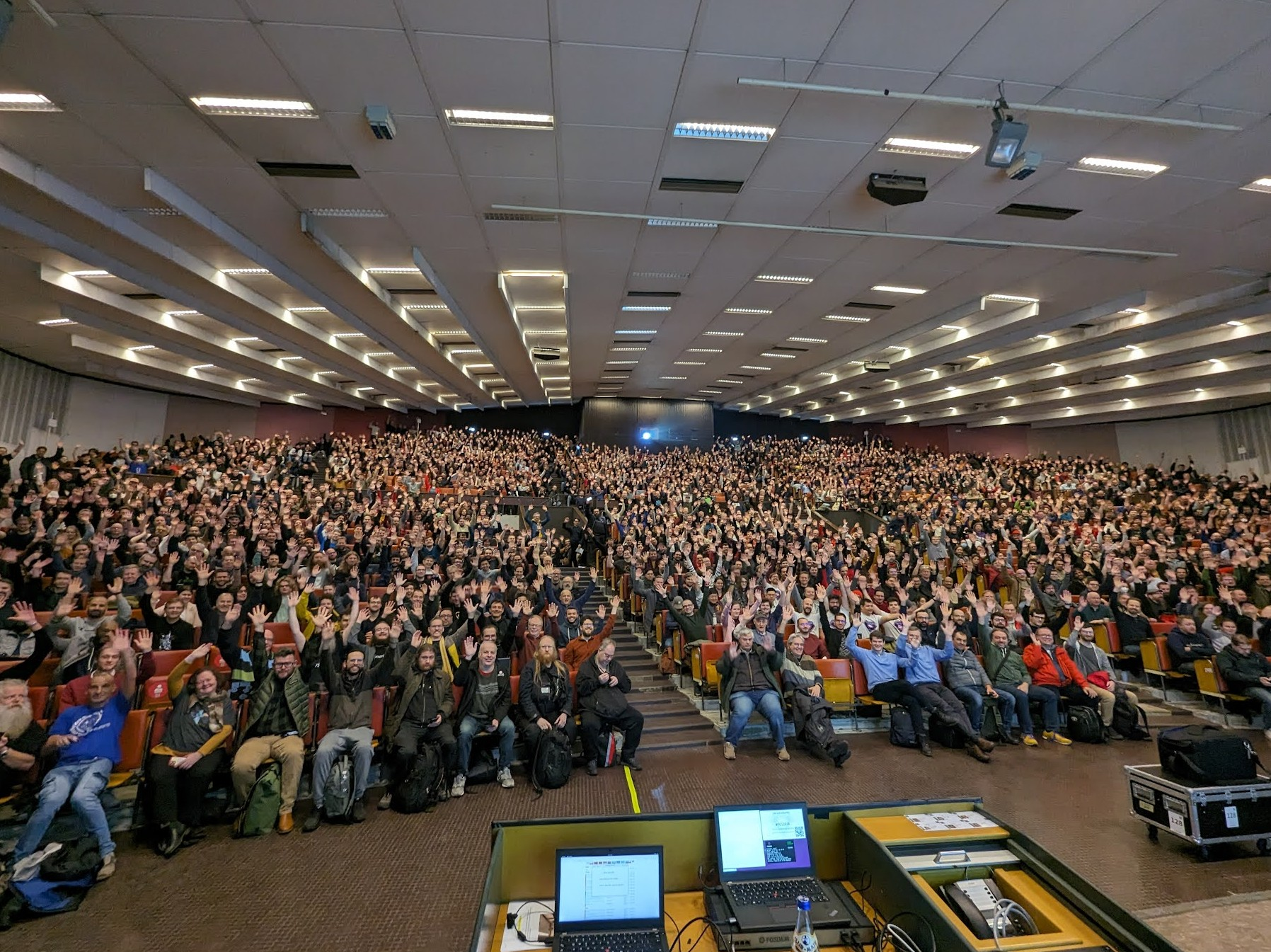
View from the speaker's desk towards the audience during the opening keynote at FOSDEM 2024

As usual, it was held in Brussels, with 948 speakers spread over 875 events and 67 themes, using the same infrastructure as the previous edition at the Université Libre de Bruxelles. The programme was similar to that of 2023 with a FOSDEM Fringe and a new set of activities named FOSDEM Junior designed as workshops for children/teenagers from 7 to 17 years old. The keynotes of this edition were about the historical value of women in technology by Laura Durieux (a recurring topic of keynotes and talks in FOSDEM to improve social diversity in the FOSS communities) and the achievements of Outreachy. The Open Source Observatory (OSOR) participated in several activities of the conference, among which was a satellite workshop.

=== FOSDEM 2025 ===
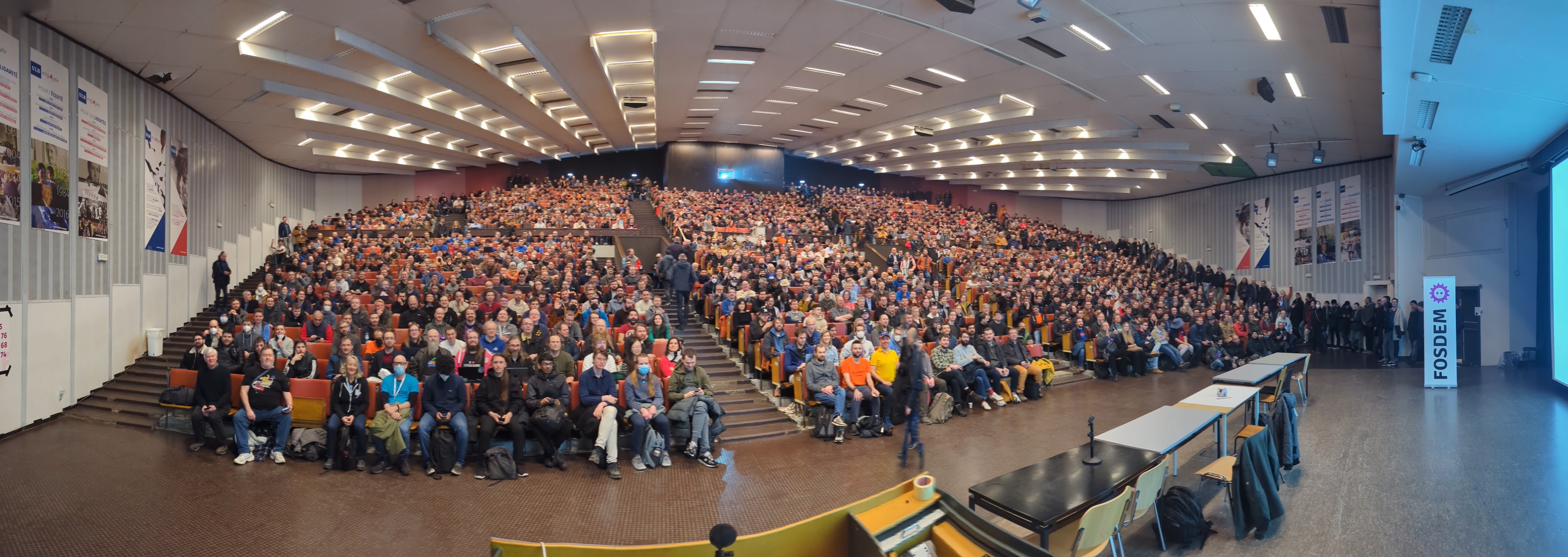
FOSDEM 2025 Opening Talk from the speaker perspective

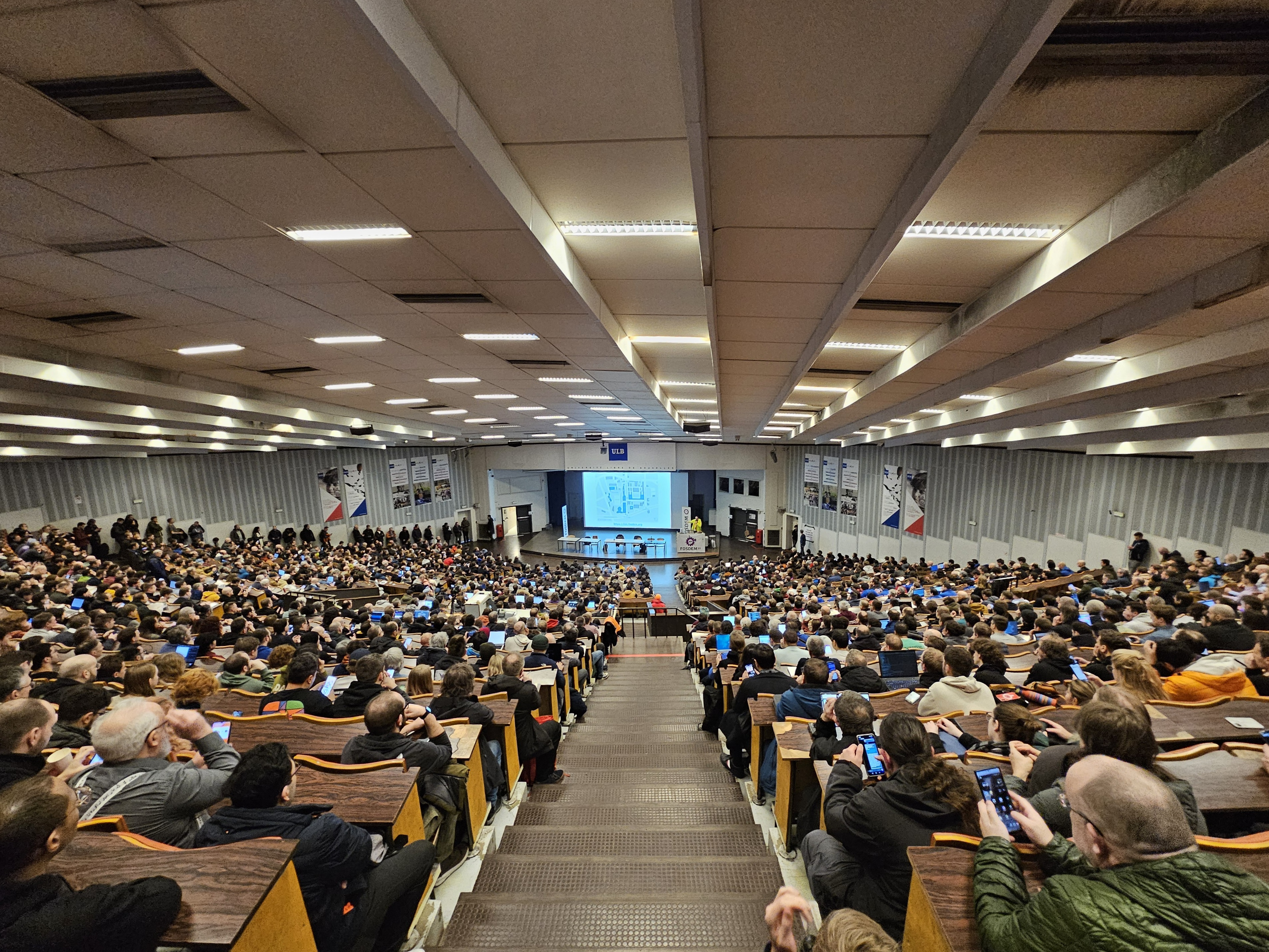
FOSDEM 2025 Closing Talk from the top of the auditorium

As usual, it took place in Brussels with 1118 speakers spread over 1074 events and 78 tracks, showing that the size of the event is growing steadily. As usual beyond BoF, also FOSDEM Fringe and FOSDEM Junior has been organized. The number of keynotes at this edition has increased compared to 2023 and 2024. Jack Dorsey's scheduled talk representing Block, Inc. caused controversy due to Dorsey's involvement in selling Twitter to Elon Musk, together with doubts about the actual background of the speaker in open-source activities, as well as, the ethical concerns of Block, Inc. current business. The Open Source Observatory (OSOR) of the European Commission participates in several developer rooms dedicated to policy and public use of open source.

=== FOSDEM 2026 ===
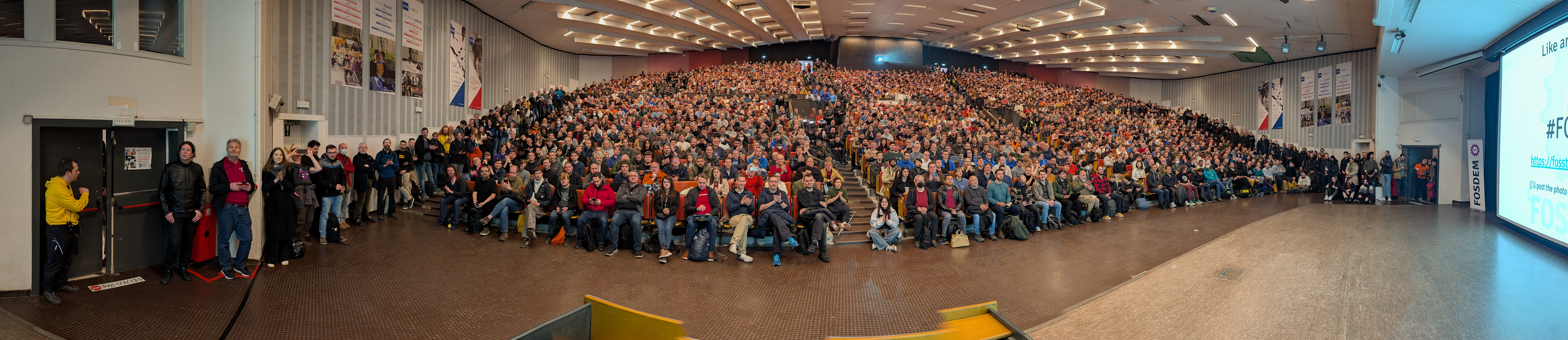
FOSDEM 2026 Opening Talk from the speaker perspective

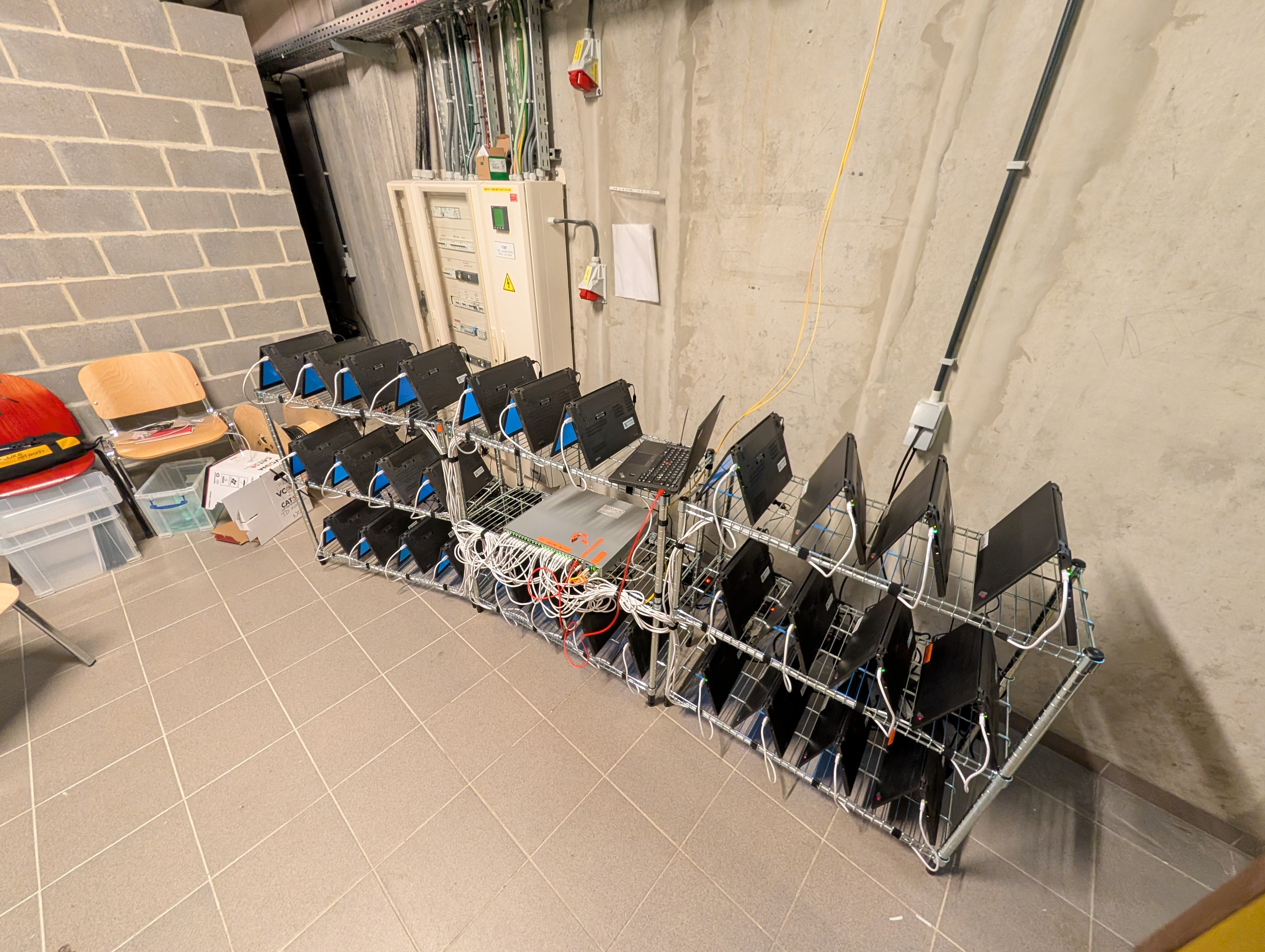
FOSDEM 2026 video render farm

== Gallery ==
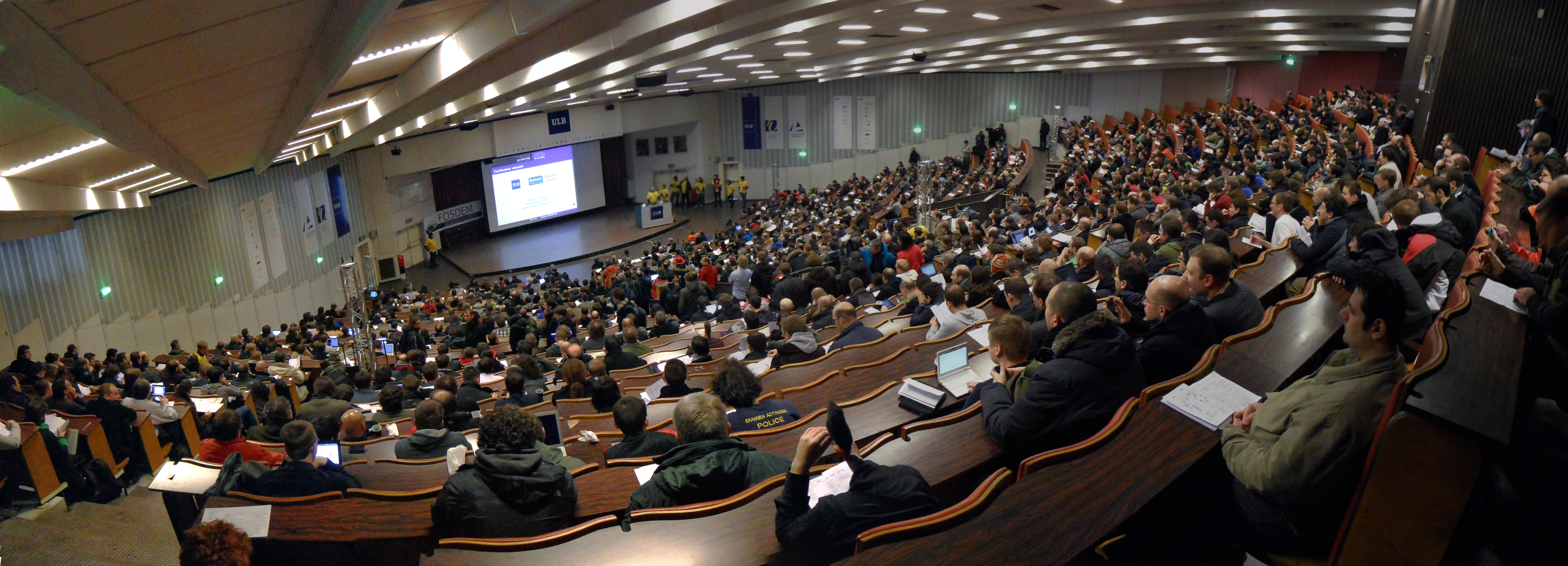
FOSDEM-2012 Opening Talk

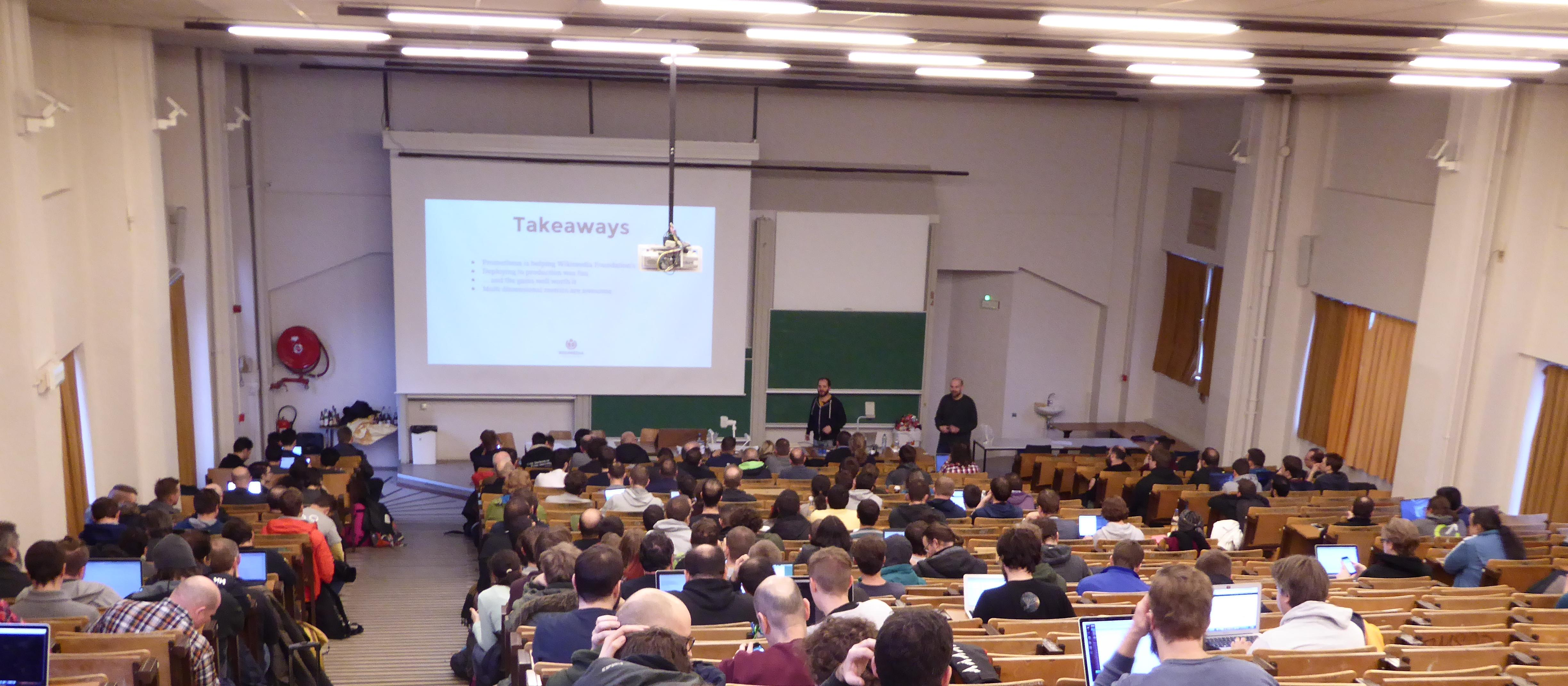
FOSDEM 2017

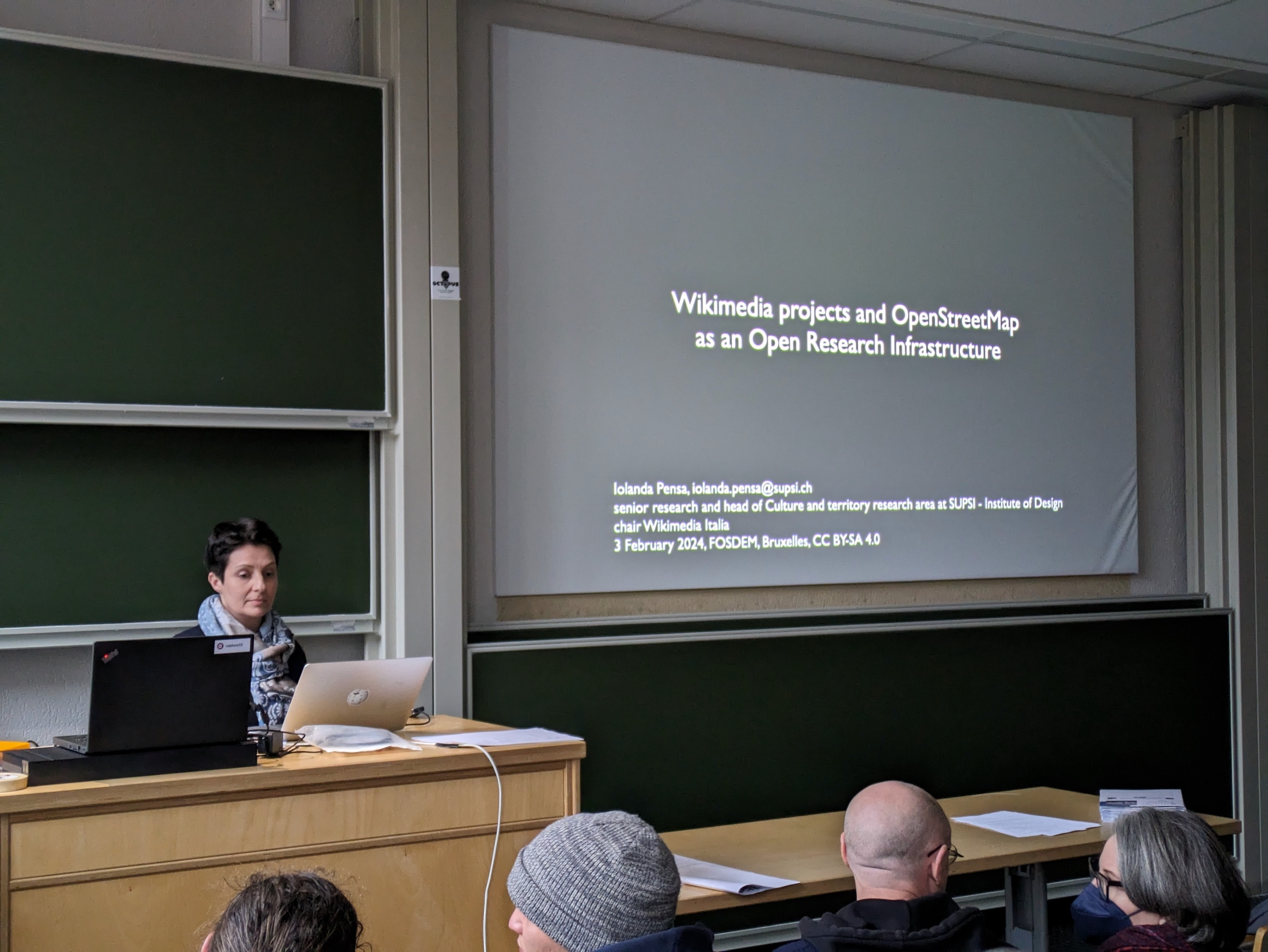
FOSDEM 2024

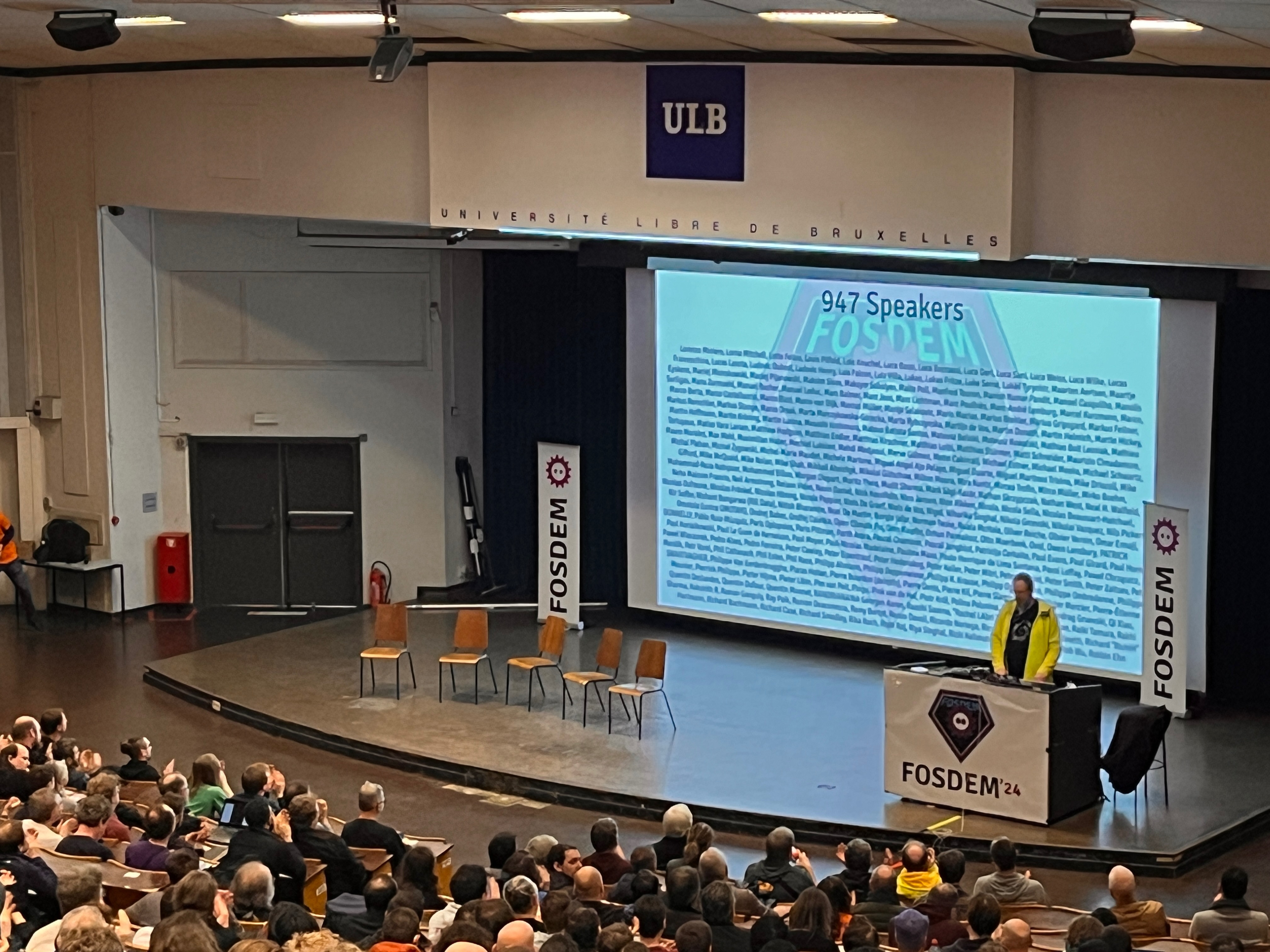
FOSDEM-2024 Plenary Discussion-Talk

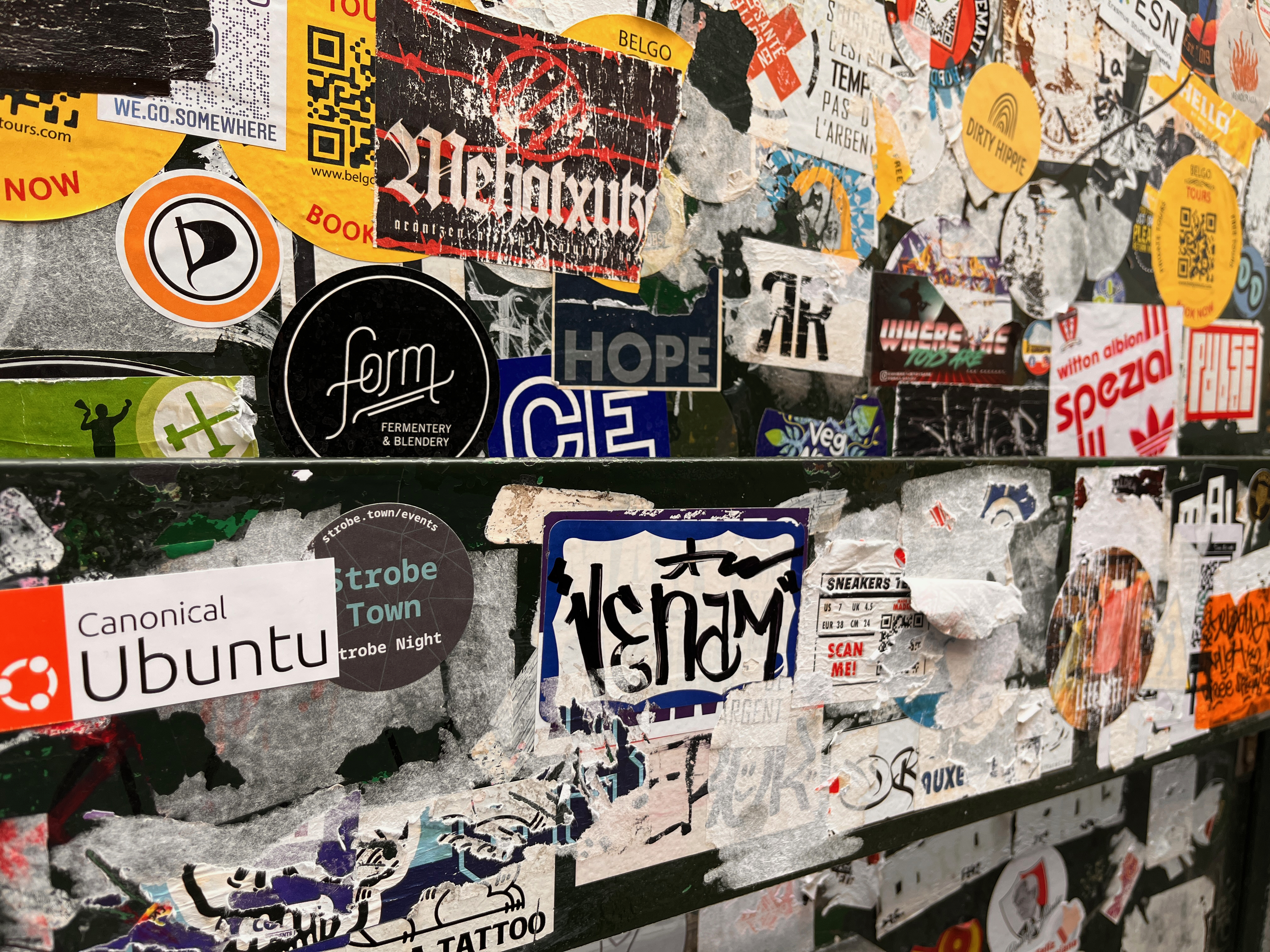
FOSDEM-2023 Stickers at Vrije Universiteit Brussel.

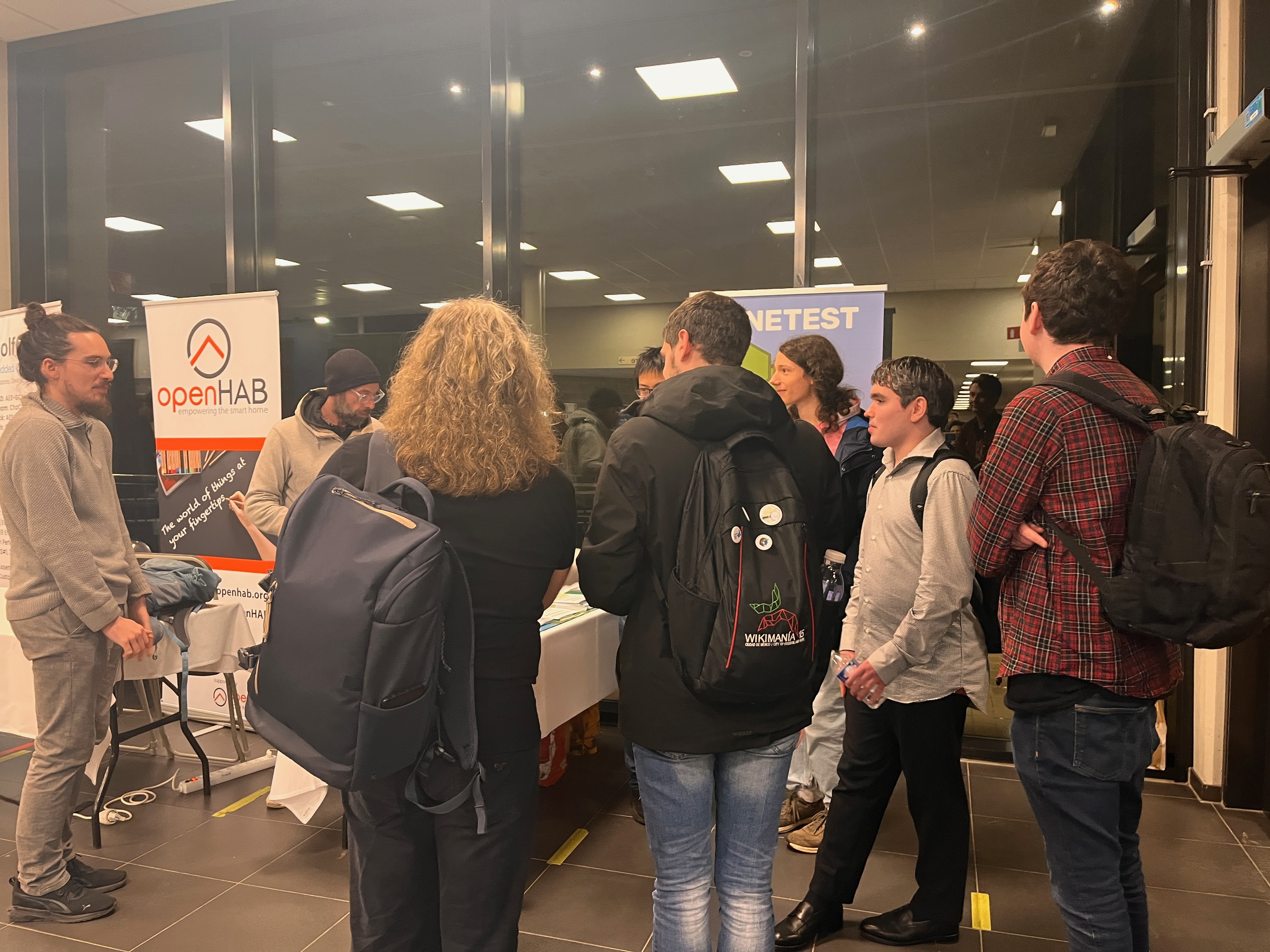
FOSDEM 2024 Stands section

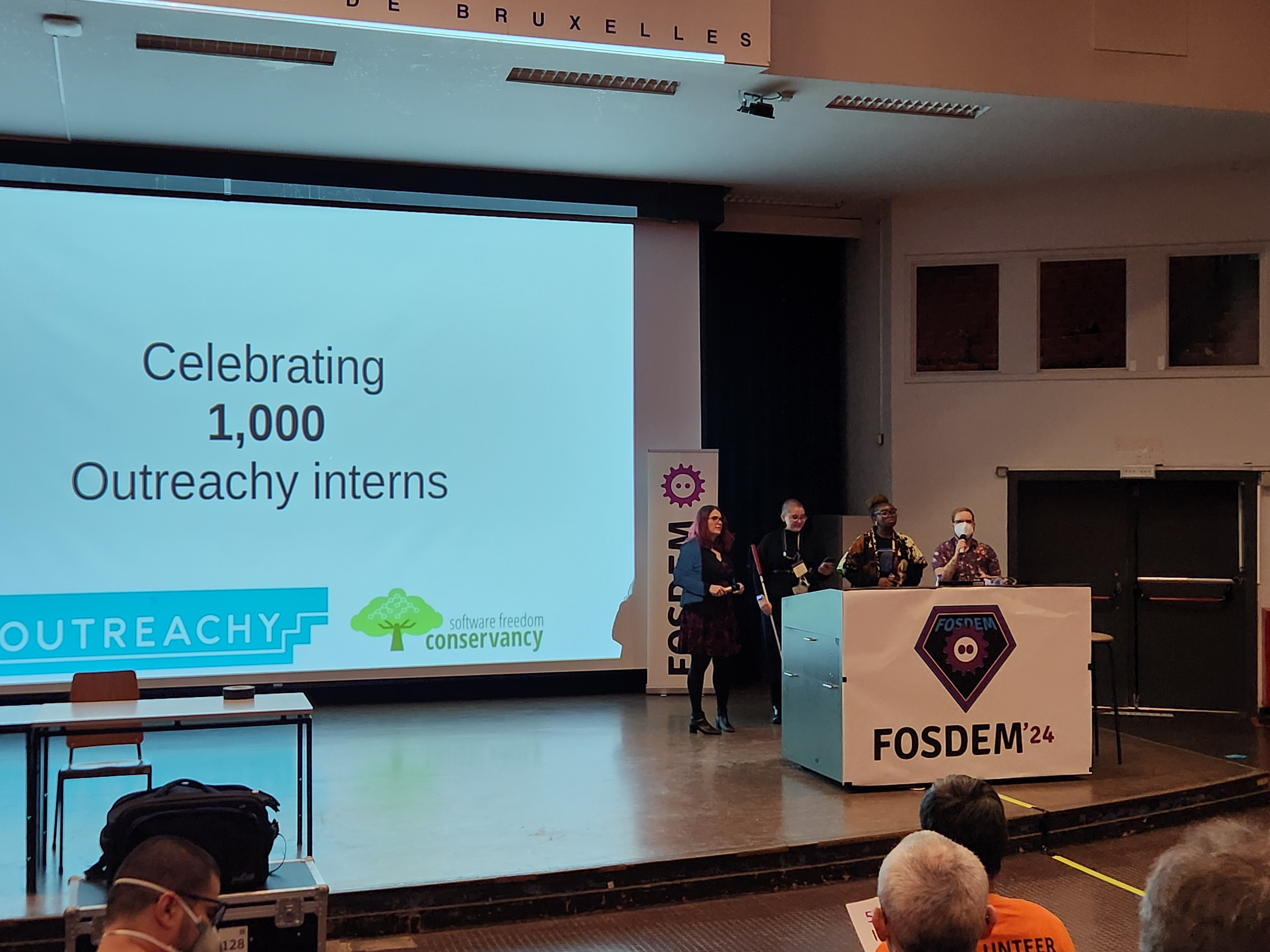
FOSDEM-2024 Outreachy Keynote commented in the main text

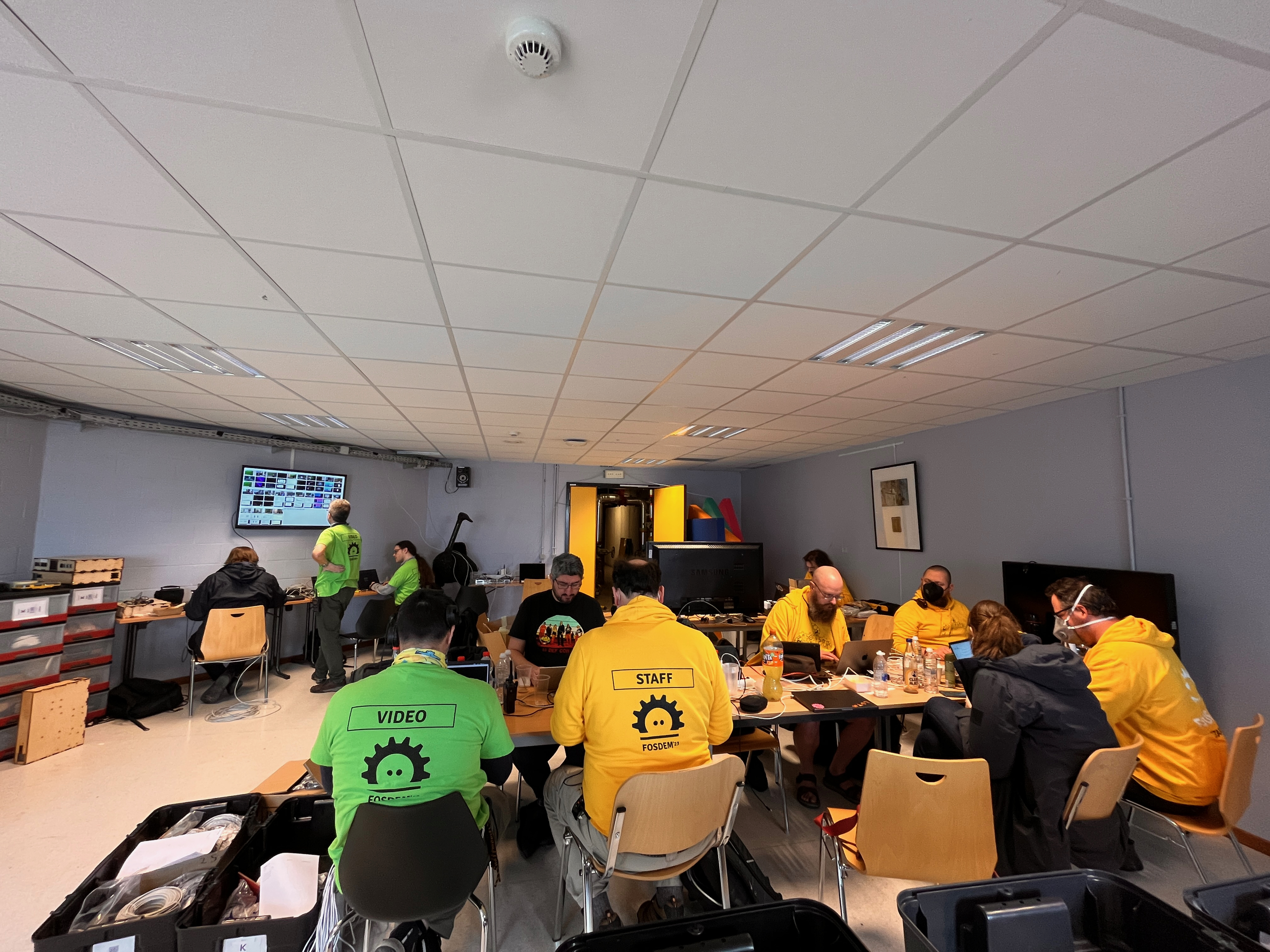
FOSDEM-2023: The NOC (Network Operations Center) of FOSDEM

== See also ==
- List of free-software events
