= Deborah Frincke =

American computer scientist

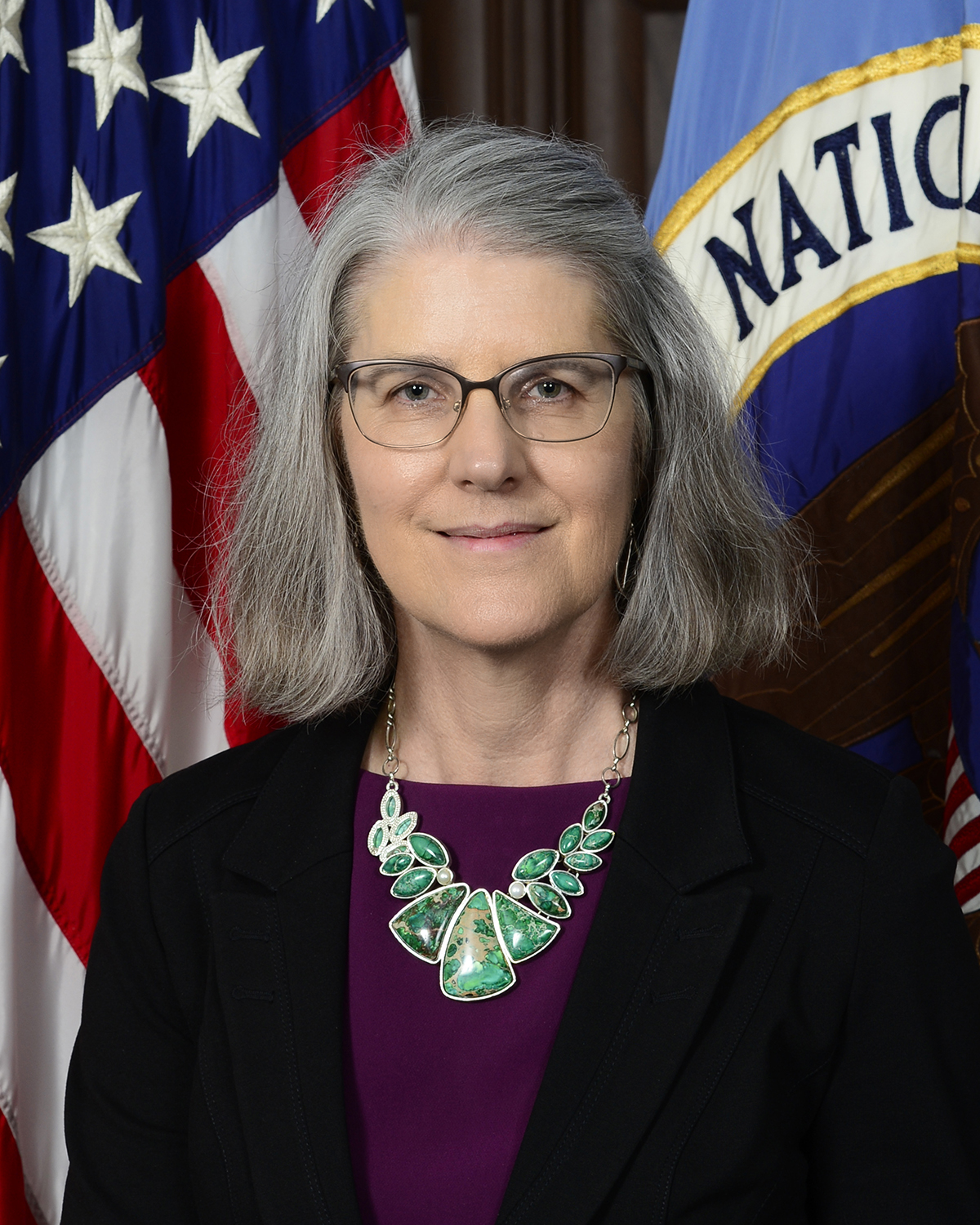

Academic background
- Education: University of California, Davis (BS, MS, PhD)

Academic work
- Discipline: Computer science
- Sub-discipline: Cybersecurity
- Institutions: Sandia National Laboratories; University of Idaho; Pacific Northwest National Laboratory; National Security Agency; Oak Ridge National Laboratory

Deborah A. Frincke is an American academic and computer scientist specializing in computer security who is the associate laboratories director of national security programs at Sandia National Laboratories.

== Education ==
Frincke was educated at the University of California, Davis, earning a Bachelor of Science degree in computer science and mathematics in 1985, a Master of Science in computer science in 1989, and a PhD in computer science in 1992.

== Career ==
Frincke began her career as a professor of computer science at the University of Idaho. She is the former chief scientist for cyber security at the Pacific Northwest National Laboratory, one of the United States Department of Energy national laboratories. Between 2011 and 2020, she worked at the National Security Agency, including as Director of Research.

As Research Director, Frincke also served as the NSA Science Advisor and the NSA Innovation Champion. Prior to becoming the director of research, Frincke led global education and training for the agency as associate director for Education and Training (ADET). While serving as ADET, Frincke also served as Commandant of National Cryptologic School, where she established the first NSA Cyber College and launched the GenCyber Program. In these roles, she led a worldwide multiservice military and civilian, corporate-level learning organization while also providing executive steering of four Service schools and 20 satellite campuses across the global enterprise. She is also a senior member of the Institute of Electrical and Electronics Engineers.

Frincke is the first female head of the research directorate at the agency, and has spoken out about the importance of diverse perspectives in computer security.

== Recognition ==
In 2017 Frincke won the Founders Award of the Colloquium for Information Systems Security Education. She was elected as an ACM Fellow in 2019 "for contributions in education, the practice of research, and the leadership of cybersecurity". Also in 2019, the UC Davis College of Engineering named her as a distinguished alumna.
