= Honeynet Project =

The Honeynet Project
- Abbreviation: THP
- Formation: 1999; 27 years ago
- Founder: Lance Spitzner
- Founded at: Ann Arbor, Michigan
- Type: 501(c)(3)
- Registration no.: 36-4460128
- Chairman: Hugo Gascón
- Chief Executive Officer: Emmanouil Vasilomanolakis
- Board of directors: Jeff Nathan; Max Kilger; David Pisano; Felix Leder; Hugo Gascón; Emmanouil Vasilomanolakis; Maximilian Hils
- Website: www.honeynet.org

The Honeynet Project is an international cybersecurity non-profit research organization that investigates new cyber attacks and develops open-source tools to help improve Internet security by tracking hackers' behavioral patterns.

== History ==
The Honeynet Project began in 1999 as a mailing list to a select few. The group expanded and officially dubbed itself as The Honeynet Project in June 2000.

The project includes dozens of active chapters around the world, including Brazil, Indonesia, Greece, India, Mexico, Iran, Australia, Ireland, and many in the United States.

== Project goals ==
The Honeynet Project has 3 main aims:

- Raise awareness of the existing threats on the Internet.
- Conduct research covering data analysis approaches unique security tool development, and gathering data about attackers and malicious software they use.
- Provide the tools and techniques used by The Honeynet Project so other organizations can benefit.

== Research and development ==
The Honeynet Project volunteers collaborate on security research efforts covering data analysis approaches, security tools development, and gathering data about hackers and malicious software. The group's research provides sensitive information regarding attackers. This includes their motives, communication methods, attack timelines, and actions following a system attack. This information is provided through Know Your Enemy white papers, The Project blog posts, and Scan of the Month Forensic challenges.

The project uses unmodified computers with the same specifications, operating systems and security as those used by many companies. These computer production systems are added online and the network of volunteers scans the network for attacks or suspicious activity. The findings are published on the company site for public viewing and knowledge.

== See also ==
- Cyber security
- Honeypot (computing)
