= Citadel (malware) =

Computer malware

Citadel is a piece of massively-distributed malware based upon Zeus. It targets credentials stored in password managers such as Keepass, Password Safe and neXus Personal Security Client.

By 2017 (it was first identified in 2011) Citadel had infected about 11 million computers worldwide and had caused over $500 million in losses.

On March 20, 2017, having been extradited from Norway to the United States, a Russian computer science professional Mark Vartanyan pleaded guilty to a computer fraud charge for his part in developing the Control Panel for Citadel. In July 2017, he was sentenced to 5 years in federal prison.

== See also ==
- Conficker
- Command and control (malware)
- Gameover ZeuS, the successor to ZeuS
- Operation Tovar
- Timeline of computer viruses and worms
- Tiny Banker Trojan
- Torpig
- Zeus (malware)
- Zombie (computer science)
