= Necurs botnet =

Distributor of malware

The Necurs botnet is a distributor of many pieces of malware, most notably Locky.

== Reports ==
Around June 1, 2016, the botnet went offline, perhaps due to a glitch in the command and control server running Necurs. However, three weeks later, Jon French from AppRiver discovered a spike in spam emails, signifying either a temporary spike in the botnet's activity or return to its normal pre-June 1 state.

In a 2020 report, it was noted to have particularly targeted India, Southeast Asia, Turkey and Mexico.

== 2020 disruption ==
On March 5, 2020, a judge of the United States District Court for the Eastern District of New York authorized Microsoft to take control of the US-based infrastructure used by Necurs. The botnet was believed to have infected more than 9 million computers worldwide. Partners in 35 countries took part in the operation.

Microsoft also worked out about 6 million domain names the botnet was likely to use over the next two years. It reported them so that authorities in the affected countries could block them. The US court orders were executed at five US-based registries while 22 country code top-level domain registries acted voluntarily. As of March 2020, an estimated 2 million computers were still infected.

== Distributed malware ==
- Bart
- Dridex
- Locky
- RockLoader
- Globeimposter

== See also ==
- Conficker
- Command and control (malware)
- Gameover ZeuS
- Operation Tovar
- Timeline of computer viruses and worms
- Tiny Banker Trojan
- Torpig
- Zeus (malware)
- Zombie (computer science)
