= Mevade Botnet =

Computer botnet

The Mevade Botnet, also known as Sefnit or SBC, is a massive botnet. Its operators are unknown and its motives seems to be multi-purpose.

In late 2013 the Tor anonymity network saw a very sudden and significant increase in users, from 800,000 daily to more than 5,000,000. A botnet was suspected and fingers pointed at Mevade. Trend Micro reported that its Smart Protection Network saw a tor module being distributed to Mevade Trojans.

== See also ==
- Conficker
- Command and control (malware)
- Gameover ZeuS
- Operation Tovar
- Timeline of computer viruses and worms
- Tiny Banker Trojan
- Torpig
- Zeus (malware)
- Zombie (computer science)
