= Executive Order 13694 =

2015 United States executive order

Executive Order 13694 was signed by President Barack Obama on April 1, 2015.

Executive Order 13694, signed on April 1, 2015 by U.S. President Barack Obama, is an Executive Order intended to limit the proliferation of malicious cyber activities. The order seeks to accomplish this by limiting threats to U.S. national security through the use of economic sanctions via the Specially Designated Nationals and Blocked Persons List (SDN List) as maintained by the Department of the Treasury's Office of Foreign Assets Control.

The executive order was titled Blocking the Property of Certain Persons Engaging in Significant Malicious Cyber-Enabled Activities, declaring a national emergency to address an extant threat to national security, foreign policy, and the economy of the United States.

It was amended by Executive Order 13757: Taking Additional Steps to Address the National Emergency with Respect to Significant Malicious Cyber-Enabled Activities, which was signed on December 28, 2016 by President Obama. This amended Executive Order 13694 to include interference in U.S. elections as a potential cause for economic sanctions.

== Executive Order 13694 by Section ==
Section	Contents
1	Defines the criteria through which the Secretary of the Treasury (in coordination of the Attorney General and Secretary of State) designates individuals for economic sanctions. Persons designated for sanctions are to be involved in activities utilizing cyberspace, which originate outside the United States in some capacity. Those activities must be deemed to have threatened U.S. national security, foreign policy, or had an economic impact. To reach the threshold for sanctions, the activities engaged must have done one or more of the following: Somehow harm or otherwise limited the function of aspects of critical infrastructure.; Adversely affect the U.S. economy through theft of funds or data that provides for a competitive advantage and financial gain.; Limit access to computer systems or networks, or adversely effected or otherwise interfered with U.S. elections.
2	Prohibits donations including food, medicine, and clothing to sanctioned individuals as they could be used to circumvent sanctions and hamper efforts to address the national emergency declared in the executive order. This is based on a clause in the International Emergency Economic Powers Act, which prohibits the president from regulating or prohibiting humanitarian donations including food, medicine, and clothing except under circumstances that constitute potential threats to the United States.
3	Outlines the specific nature of prohibitions against persons identified in Section 1, which include both giving and receiving funding, goods, or services that may somehow benefit those designated for sanctions.
4	Suspends sanctioned immigrants and non-immigrants from entering the United States under a travel ban as outlined under Presidential Proclamation 8693, Suspension of Entry of Aliens Subject to United Nations Security Council Travel Bans and International Emergency Economic Powers Act Sanctions.
5	Prohibits efforts or conspiracies formed to evade sanctions against individuals designated under this Executive Order.
6	Identifies legal terminology pertinent to the Executive Order, including "person," "entity," "United States person," "critical infrastructure sector," and "misappropriation."
7	Waives prior notice to persons designated for sanctions under this Executive Order even if they possess interests or presence within the United States under the justification as notification would facilitate those persons in the evasion of sanctions.
8	Delegates authority to the Secretary of the Treasury (in coordination with the Attorney General and Secretary of State) to carry out the execution of duties as described in the Executive Order. The Secretary of the Treasury is further authorized to redelegate this authority as appropriate.
9	Tasks the Secretary of the Treasury (in coordination with the Attorney General and the Secretary of State) to report to Congress regarding the national emergency declared in the Executive Order.
10	Charges the Secretary of the Treasury (in consultation with the Attorney General and the Secretary of State) to determine when sanctions of a person are no longer warranted, which currently involves the removal of such persons from the SDN List. Executive Order 13694 was amended to include this section as part of the signing and publication of Executive Order 13757.
11	Makes note that the Executive Order serves as implementation and execution of current U.S. statues and codes and does not create new U.S. law.

== Notable Sanctions Under E.O. 13694 ==
Date	Entities Sanctioned	Notes
December 29, 2016	Individuals: Vladimir Alexseyev, Aleksey Belan, Evgeniy Bogachev, Sergey Giznov, Igor Korobov, Igor Kostyukov Organizations: ANO PO KSI, Federal Security Service (FSB), Main Intelligence Directorate (GRU), Special Technology Center (STC, LTD), ZOR Security	First use of sanctions authority under E.O. 13694. Includes two individuals for cybercriminal activity (Belan and Bogachev), as activity undertaken to undermine the 2016 U.S. presidential election by Russian intelligence services. Korobov died in November 2018.
March 15, 2018	Individuals: Yevgeniy Prigozhin, Dzheykhun Aslanov, Anna Bogacheva, Maria Bovda, Robert Bovda, Mikhail Burchik, Mikhail Bystrov, Irina Kaverzina, Aleksandra Krylova, Vadim Podkopaev, Sergey Polozov, Gleb Vasilchenko, Vladimir Venkov Organizations: Internet Research Agency (IRA), Concord Management and Consulting,	Sanctioning of the Internet Research Agency and associated individuals and organizations for interference in the 2016 U.S. presidential election and for assessed attribution for the NotPetya cyberattack.
November 28, 2018	Individuals: Ali Khorashadizadeh, Mohammad Ghorbaniyan	Iranian hackers associated with SamSam ransomware, assessed to have accumulated over 7000 Bitcoin in ransom payments.
December 5, 2019	Individuals: Maksim Yakubets, Igor Turashev, Denis Gusev, Dmitriy Smirnov, Artem Yakubets, Ivan Tuchkov, Andrey Plotnitskiy, Dmitriy Slobodskoy, Kirill Slobodskoy, Aleksei Bashlikov, Ruslan Zamulko, David Guberman, Carlos Alvares, Georgios Manidis, Tatiana Shevchuk, Azamat Safarov, Gulsara Burkhonova Organizations: Evil Corp	Sanctions for individuals linked to Evil Corp, a Russian-based cybercriminal group attributed to be behind Dridex malware.
March 2, 2020	Individuals: Tian Yinyin, Li Jiadong Organizations: Lazarus Group	Chinese nationals sanctioned for providing support to the North Korean state-sponsored Lazarus Group.
June 16, 2020	Individuals: Richard Uzuh, Micheal Olorunyomi, Alex Ogunshakin, Felix Okpoh, Nnamdi Benson, Abiola Kayode	Nigerian nationals associated with business email compromise and romance fraud scams.
September 10, 2020	Individuals: Andrii Derkach, Artem Lifshits, Anton Andreyev, Darya Aslanova Organizations: Internet Research Agency (IRA)	Russian nationals sanctioned for support to the Internet Research Agency and interference in U.S. elections.
August 8, 2022	Organizations: Tornado Cash	Tornado Cash sanctioned for facilitating the laundering of over $7 billion worth of Cryptocurrency, including over $455 million stolen by the Lazarus Group.

== See also ==
- Office of Foreign Assets Control
- Specially Designated Nationals and Blocked Persons List
- Economic Sanctions
- International Emergency Economic Powers Act
- National Emergencies Act
- Immigration and Nationality Act of 1952
- United States Code
