= Turf war (conflict) =

Conflict over territory or resources

A turf war is a conflict or dispute over territory, influence, or a particular area of activity. Often associated with gangs or criminal organizations (gang wars), the term is also used to describe other competitive situations and encapsulates a power struggle where competing groups or individuals vie for dominance within a defined, usually limited, domain.

== Definition ==
According to the Oxford English Dictionary (OED), a turf war is "an acrimonious dispute between rival groups over territory or a particular sphere of influence." The OED notes that the phrase originated in the 1970s, stemming from the informal meaning of "turf" as an area controlled by a street gang or criminal.

Similarly, Merriam-Webster dictionary defines a turf war as a fight for "territory that one considers to be under one's control". Cambridge Advanced Learner's Dictionary defines it as "a fight or an argument to decide who controls an area or an activity".

== Organizational politics ==
The turf war is considered to be a common organizational pathology. While there is no agreed-upon definition, generally the turf wars (also known as territorial games) occur when actors ostensibly working towards the common goal (for example, the government departments) internally consider themselves to be competing (for resources, promotions, or publicity). Despite their superiors and customers looking for collaboration between the actors, the people involved use new assignments as opportunities to prevent engagement by the rival structures, for example by hiding relevant information or channeling the rival's activities into unimportant tasks. Turf wars sometimes hinder projects that clearly benefit the society, like implementation of governmental one-stop shop arrangements.

The turf wars occur within a broad range of organizations, from the US military branches (with Navy and Air Force essentially running independent air campaigns in the Vietnam War) to restaurant chains (for a long time Pizza Hut, Taco Bell, and KFC were running parallel procurement and administrative tasks despite all being subsidiaries of PepsiCo).

Herrera et al. (2017) suggest the following conditions to be essential for a turf war:

- joint production: the actors working towards a shared outcome;
- property rights: the actors are in control of their areas of production and are able to opt to either include other actors or protect their "turf";
- competition: actors should perceive some indivisible prize to be gained from associating their names with the outcome: promotion, media attention, securing a prestigious project.

== Criminal activity ==
In criminology, a turf war is a conflict between criminal organizations competing for control over a specific geographic area ("turf"), illicit market, or revenue stream. Without property rights and third-party regulation in place, peaceful sharing of criminal proceeds is near-impossible, and the turf wars are typically violent. The duration and scale of wars vary greatly, with Barroso (2021) defining the turf war between neighborhood gangs as multiple days with shootings per week and Robles et al. (2015) identifying the inter-cartel wars in Mexico states when the yearly number of homicides exhibits a major change (three standard deviations) from the multiyear trend.

In rare cases, turf wars occurred online between the gangs of cybercriminals. In 2010, the ZeuS trojan came under attack of its rival SpyEye, that stole the banking information accumulated by ZeuS and removed the rival toolkit from the infected computer.

== Animal behavior ==
In the animal behavior studies, researchers occasionally use the term "turf war" to define a group action of animals defending their territory. The action is not necessarily physical and can include, for example, loud sounds intended to provide information about the group's size. In case of an intra-species conflict, the turf wars typically do not escalate to an all-out hostility that can cause serious injuries, these wars are "limited".

== See also ==
- Agonistic behaviour
- Gang violence
- Irredentism
- Organizational politics
- Range war
- Territoriality

== Sources ==
- Bannister, Frank (2005). "E-government and administrative power: the one-stop-shop meets the turf war". Electronic Government. 2 (2): 160. doi:10.1504/EG.2005.007092. ISSN 1740-7494.
- Barroso Perpétuo, Maria Eduarda (2021). Turf Wars: A Study of Criminal Groups in Rio de Janeiro (PDF) (M.Sc.). Universidade Federal do Rio de Janeiro.
- Finklea, Kristin (2013). The Interplay of Borders, Turf, Cyberspace, and Jurisdiction: Issues Confronting U.S. Law Enforcement (PDF) (Report). Congressional Research Service.
- Herrera, Helios; Reuben, Ernesto; Ting, Michael M. (2017). "Turf wars". Journal of Public Economics. 152: 143–153. doi:10.1016/j.jpubeco.2017.06.002.
- Maynard Smith, J.; Price, G. R. (1973). "The logic of animal conflict". Nature. 246 (5427): 15–18. Bibcode:1973Natur.246...15S. doi:10.1038/246015a0.
- Robles, Gustavo; Calderon, Gabriela; Magaloni, Beatriz (2015). "The Economic Consequences of Drug Trafficking Violence in Mexico" (PDF). Stanford University.
- Tomecek, S.M. (2009). "Turf Wars". Animal Communication. Animal behavior. Chelsea House Publishers. pp. 53–55. ISBN 978-1-60413-091-1.
- Trejo, Guillermo; Ley, Sandra (2020-09-03). "Why Cartels Went to War". Votes, Drugs, and Violence: The Political Logic of Criminal Wars in Mexico. Cambridge University Press. pp. 69–112. doi:10.1017/9781108894807.003. ISBN 978-1-108-89480-7.
