= Intel Threat Detection Technology =

Intel Threat Detection Technology (TDT) is a CPU-level technology created by Intel in 2018 to enable host endpoint protections to use a CPU's low-level access to detect threats to a system. TDT consists of multiple components including Accelerated Memory Scanning, which uses the CPU's integrated GPU to scan memory, and Advanced Platform Telemetry, which uses processor-level activity monitoring to detect unusual activity. It is supported on sixth-generation or newer Intel Core CPUs and additional capabilities were added to the 11th generation Core processors.

Intel TDT is integrated into several third-party anti-malware solutions including Microsoft Defender, Check Point Harmony Endpoint, CrowdStrike Falcon, and others.

== Accelerated Memory Scanning ==
Accelerated Memory Scanning (also referred to as "Advanced Memory Scanning") uses the CPU's integrated GPU to scan memory for malicious code, instead of using the CPU directly. This improves system responsiveness during anti-malware scanning. and lowers power consumption. Features include pattern matching, using random forest decision trees, string extraction, entropy calculation, and Euclidean clustering.

== Advanced Platform Telemetry ==
Advanced Platform Telemetry collects CPU-level telemetry to detect uncommon activity patterns which might be indicative of malware. The telemetry data is collected from the CPU performance monitoring unit (PMU) and doesn't require a large signature database to detect malware. Instead, it uses machine-learning based correlations to identify indicators of attack

For example, Microsoft Defender is able to use TDT's Advanced Platform Telemetry features to detect processor usage patterns indicative of ransomware and cryptojacking with TDT so it can detect them.

== See also ==
- Intel vPro
