= Phillip Porras =

- Education: University of California, Irvine
- Known for: Conficker analysis
- Awards: 2013 SRI Fellow
- Scientific career
- Fields: Information security
- Workplaces: The Aerospace Corporation; SRI International
- Website: www.csl.sri.com/users/porras/

Phillip A. Porras is a computer scientist and security researcher known for his work combating the Conficker worm. Porras leads the Internet Security Group in SRI International's Computer Science Laboratory.

He was previously a manager of the Trusted Computer Systems Department of The Aerospace Corporation. Porras holds 12 U.S. patents, and was named an SRI Fellow in 2013.

== Education ==
Porras attended the University of California, Irvine.

== Career ==
Porras was an author of patents involved in the 2008 case SRI International, Inc. v. Internet Security Systems, Inc.

During the Conficker worm's initial attack, Porras was running a honeypot and was one of the first security researchers to notice it; and was part of the "Conficker Cabal" that helped combat the worm. Porras' team in SRI published an extensive analysis of the worm. In 2010, Porras was a co-author of BLADE, a collaboration between SRI and Georgia Tech researchers designed to prevent drive-by download malware attacks.

== Awards and memberships ==
Porras was named an SRI Fellow in 2013 for his long-term work in information security and malware analysis, and his recent research on OpenFlow.
