= Ilya Sachkov =

Russian entrepreneur

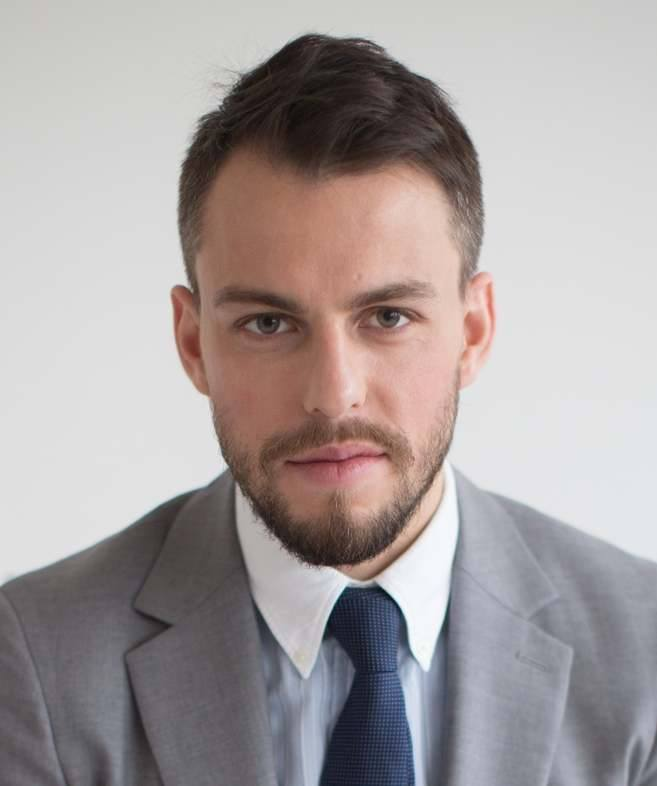
Sachkov in 2015

Ilya Sachkov (Russian: Илья Сачков) is a Russian cybersecurity expert and founder and CEO of Group-IB, a cybersecurity company specialising in the detection and prevention of cyberattacks. He received an award from Russian president Vladimir Putin for his work in 2019. In September 2021, he was detained by the Russian government's Federal Security Service on treason charges.

According to Bloomberg News, he is alleged to have provided the U.S. government with information about the Russian government's "Fancy Bear" operation that sought to influence the 2016 United States presidential election.

== Career ==
Sachkov started Group-IB at age 17 while studying at the Bauman Moscow State Technical University, and according to the Financial Times, "attempted to build a global business while remaining on the good side of the Russian government."

In June, 2017, Sachkov was appointed a Commissioner in the Global Commission on the Stability of Cyberspace, an international multistakeholder commission to develop diplomatic norms against national cyber-attacks. He served until the commission's successful conclusion in November, 2019.

== Views on Russian government handling of cybercrime ==
In a panel with Russian prime minister Mikhail Mishustin in attendance, Sachkov criticised the Russian government's response to ransomware attacks emanating from Russia, pointing to Maksim Yakubets as an example. Sachkov's criticism of the Russian government's apparent tolerance of some online criminals continued until late until his arrest by the FSB in September 2021.

== Detention and conviction on treason charges ==
In a statement released by his lawyer to Forbes Russia in November 2021, Sachkov rejected the treason charges saying he is "neither a traitor nor a spy" and appealed to Putin to move him to house arrest while he awaits trial, after his detention was extended by three months. Russian businessman Boris Titov called for answers in a Facebook post, saying "It is necessary for investigators to explain themselves", otherwise it would deal a "critical blow" to the sector. Russian state news agency TASS said the case materials are "classified" and "no further details are available." In June 2023, the case was transferred to the Moscow City Court for consideration on the merits.

Group-IB co-founder Dmitry Volkov who took over as chief executive said the company did not know what Sachkov had been charged with and was convinced of his innocence. Volkov said that since all case materials are classified, it "provides fertile ground for rumours and speculations", saying that without access to those materials "making any assumptions or promoting any versions would be wrong."

The Financial Times reported that according to Russian news outlet RBC, a lawyer for Sergei Mikhailov, a former top FSB cyber official convicted of treason, claimed Sachkov gave false testimony which led to the conviction.

According to Bloomberg News, Sachkov was alleged to have provided information to western intelligence agencies about Vladislav Klyushin, a founder of another cybersecurity company, who was arrested in Switzerland in March 2021.

On July 25, 2023, the Moscow court sentenced Sachkov to "14 years in prison." The sentence was a reduction from the state prosecutor's original request for an 18-year sentence and was delivered during an in camera session.

== See also ==
- Fancy Bear
- Ransomware
