= Group-IB =

Russian cybersecurity company

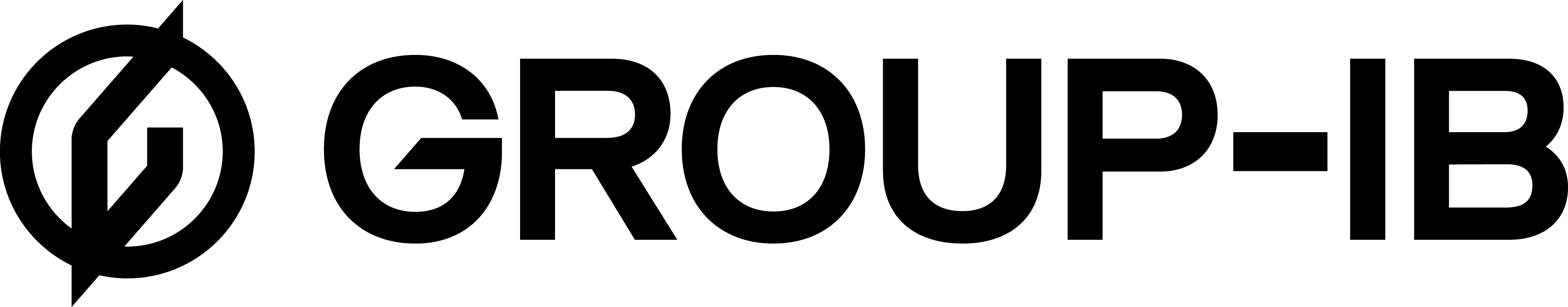
- Type: Private
- Industry: Computer security
- Founded: 2003 in Moscow, Russia
- Founder: Dmitry Volkov; Ilya Sachkov
- Headquarters: Singapore
- Key people: Dmitry Volkov, CEO; Ilya Sachkov, founder
- Website: www.group-ib.com

Group-IB is a cybersecurity company. It was founded in 2003 by Ilya Sachkov and Dmitry Volkov in Moscow, Russia.

In 2023, it spun off its Russian operations with its operations outside Russia led by Dmitry Volkov, a Russian national, and based in Singapore, while the Russian entity continues operations in Moscow under the F.A.C.C.T. name.

== History ==
Group-IB was founded in 2003 by Ilya Sachkov and Dmitry Volkov in Russia. In 2017, the company signed a data sharing agreement with INTERPOL, to coordinate the exchange of threat intelligence. The company moved its headquarters to Singapore in 2019.

In 2019, Group-IB said that the Silence hacking group had stolen at least $3 million from Dutch-Bangla Bank cash machines and that details of more than 460,000 Turkish payment cards were being sold online. It also reported takedowns of 180,000 links to pirated copies of Game of Thrones in Russia, carried out for the streaming service Amediateka.

In September 2021, Ilya Sachkov, its co-founder and CEO, was detained by Russian authorities for treason. He was sentenced to 14 years in prison. The Russian and international business were later split with the business sold in April 2023 to Russian management to be branded F.A.C.C.T. F.A.C.C.T. would market Group-IB products and services while being a separate entity allowing Group-IB to not directly have a presence in Russia. The move was reportedly because its Russian ties were hurting its business. It was reported that despite the business split, founder Ilya Sachkov remained the primary shareholder of both companies. In April 2023, Group-IB said that Sachkov had sold his 37.5% stake in its Singapore company to members of its senior management. Reuters reported that the management team then owned 60% of Group-IB, with the rest held by two venture funds.

In December 2023, the company's Moscow spinoff F.A.C.C.T. discovered that a hacking group was targeting Russian companies with a war-related phishing attack. Group-IB, based in Singapore, continues to be headed by Dmitry Volkov, a Russian national.

After the Mobile Guardian security breach in August 2024, Group-IB said it had identified more than 300 account credentials related to Mobile Guardian offered for sale, 70 of them on the dark web.

In July 2025, it was reported that Group-IB was acting as legal agent for Tencent, a company controlled by the Chinese Communist Party, in attempting to kill FreeWechat.com, an anti-censorship WeChat archive developed by Chinese censorship monitoring website GreatFire to enforce the Communist Party's Great Firewall.
