= BLADE (software) =

- Original authors: Phillip Porras and Vinod Yegneswaran at SRI International; Long Lu and Wenke Lee at the Georgia Institute of Technology
- Platform: Cross-platform
- Type: Information security
- Website: www.blade-defender.org

BLADE (Block All Drive-by Download Exploits) is a computer program that was developed by Phillip Porras and Vinod Yegneswaran at SRI International, along with Long Lu and Wenke Lee at the Georgia Institute of Technology. BLADE is funded by grants from the National Science Foundation, the United States Army Research Laboratory, and the Office of Naval Research. The program is designed to prevent drive-by download malware attacks.
