= Vladislav Klyushin =

Russian businessman

Vladislav Klyushin (Russian: Владислав Клюшин; born 1980) is a Russian businessman and founder and CEO of M-13, a Russian company that offers media monitoring and cybersecurity services. In March 2021, he was arrested upon his arrival in Switzerland on a warrant from the United States Department of Justice charging him with insider trading using confidential data stolen from US companies. Facing extradition to the US, Klyushin's lawyer maintained that the insider trading charge was fabricated as a “pretext” to get him to the US, where he will be pressed for information on the Russian government's "Fancy Bear" operation that sought to influence the 2016 United States presidential election. He was extradited to the US on December 19, 2021.

Klyushin was convicted by a federal jury on charges of conspiracy, wire fraud and securities fraud on February 14, 2023. Klyushin was released in a 26-person prisoner exchange on August 1, 2024.

== Criminal activities ==
Klyushin's criminal enterprise involved hacking into U.S. financial document management firms Donnelley Financial Solutions and Toppan Merrill to steal confidential earnings reports before their public release. Working with Ivan Ermakov, a former officer in Russia's GRU intelligence service and member of the notorious "Fancy Bear" hacking group, Klyushin orchestrated trades that ultimately netted $93 million in illegal profits between 2018 and 2020. The scheme involved multiple co-conspirators in St. Petersburg and attracted wealthy Russian investors, including former mining executives who were later placed on U.S. sanctions lists.

== Arrest ==
Klyushin was arrested by Swiss authorities in March 2021 while on a skiing vacation and was subsequently extradited to the United States. He was convicted on all charges in February 2023 and sentenced to nine years in federal prison, along with an order to forfeit $34 million. However, his incarceration was short-lived—he was released as part of the largest U.S.-Russia prisoner exchange in history on August 1, 2024, which also freed Wall Street Journal reporter Evan Gershkovich and former U.S. Marine Paul Whelan. Klyushin had received a Medal of Honor from Vladimir Putin in June 2020, highlighting his value to the Kremlin as both a government contractor and financial operative.

The case demonstrated how Russian operatives used sophisticated cyberattacks to circumvent international economic sanctions and funnel capital into Russia's economy. Prosecutors described Klyushin's operation as more than simple insider trading—it represented a systematic effort to exploit vulnerabilities in the global financial system for geopolitical purposes, with proceeds allegedly reaching high-ranking Russian government officials.

== See also ==
- Ilya Sachkov
- Russian interference in the 2016 United States elections
