= Maksim Yakubets =

Ukrainian national and a computer expert (born 1987)

Maksim Viktorovich Yakubets
- Максим Викторович Якубец
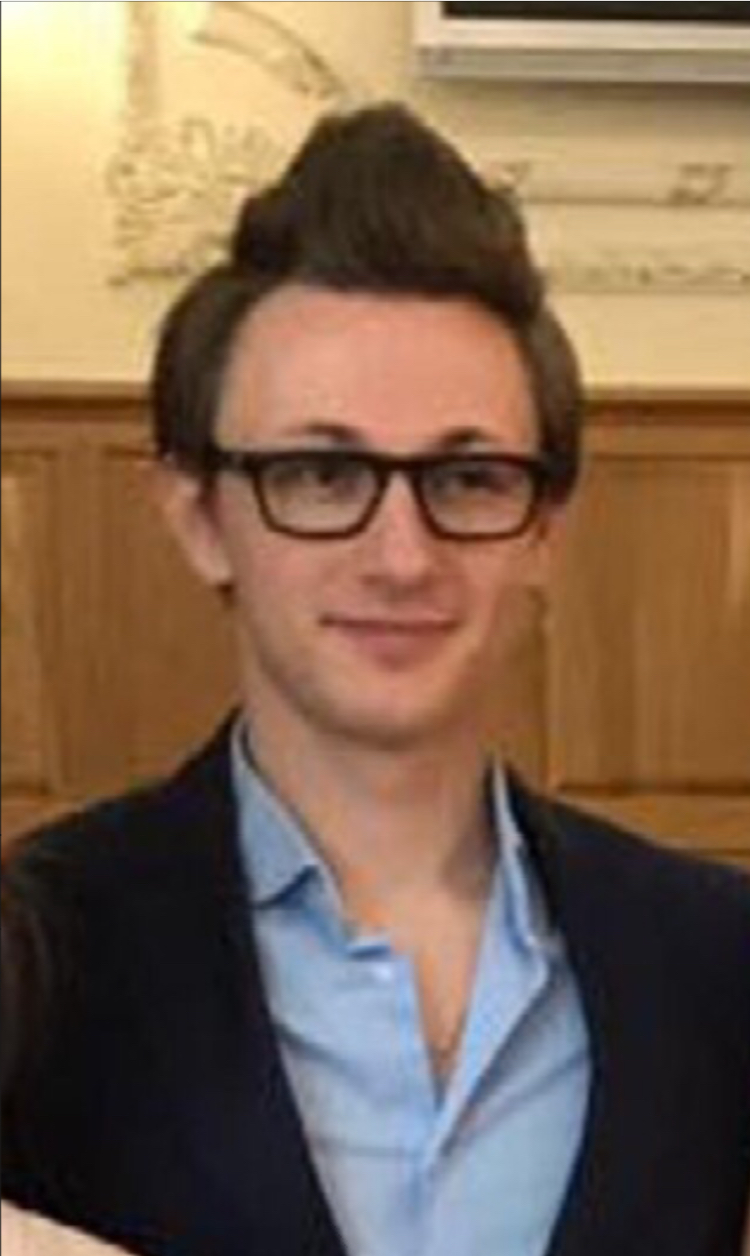
- Born: May 20, 1987 (age 39); Polonne, Khmelnytskyi Oblast, Ukraine, Soviet Union
- Other names: "Aqua," "Aquamo," "Shluhnet," "388888"
- Known for: Hacking
- Criminal charge: Cybercriminal

Maksim Viktorovich Yakubets (Russian: Максим Викторович Якубец; born May 20, 1987) is a Ukrainian-born Russian computer expert and alleged computer hacker. He is alleged to have been a member of the Evil Corp, Jabber Zeus Crew, as well as the alleged leader of the Bugat malware conspiracy. Russian media openly describe Yakubets as a "hacker who stole $100 million", friend of Dmitry Peskov and discussed his lavish lifestyle, including luxury wedding with a daughter of FSB officer Eduard Bendersky and Lamborghini with "ВОР" (Russian for "thief") registration plate. Yakubets's impunity in Russia is perceived as clue of his close ties with FSB, but also criticized by domestic information security experts such as Ilya Sachkov.

== Indictments ==
On November 13, 2019, Yakubets was charged in the United States District Court for the Western District of Pennsylvania for allegedly conspiring in the development, maintenance, distribution, and infection of Bugat malware. The following day, he was charged in the United States District Court for the District of Nebraska for his alleged involvement in the installation of Zeus.
