= Cryptojacking =

Hijacking computers to mine currency

Cryptojacking is the act of exploiting a computer to mine cryptocurrencies, often through websites, against the user's will or while the user is unaware. One notable piece of software used for cryptojacking was Coinhive, which was used in over two-thirds of cryptojacks before its March 2019 shutdown. The cryptocurrencies mined the most often are privacy coins—coins with hidden transaction histories—such as Monero and Zcash.

Like most malicious attacks on the computing public, the motive is profit, but unlike other threats, it is designed to remain completely hidden from the user. Cryptojacking malware can lead to slowdowns and crashes due to straining of computational resources.

Bitcoin mining by personal computers infected with malware is being challenged by dedicated hardware, such as FPGA and ASIC platforms, which are more efficient in terms of power consumption and thus may have lower costs than theft of computing resources.

== Notable events ==
In June 2011, Symantec warned about the possibility that botnets could mine covertly for bitcoins. Malware used the parallel processing capabilities of GPUs built into many modern video cards. Although the average PC with an integrated graphics processor is virtually useless for bitcoin mining, tens of thousands of PCs laden with mining malware could produce some results.

In mid-August 2011, bitcoin mining botnets were detected, and less than three months later, bitcoin mining trojans had infected Mac OS X.

In April 2013, electronic sports organization E-Sports Entertainment was accused of hijacking 14,000 computers to mine bitcoins; the company later settled the case with the State of New Jersey.

German police arrested two people in December 2013 who customized existing botnet software to perform bitcoin mining, which police said had been used to mine at least $950,000 worth of bitcoins.

For four days in December 2013 and January 2014, Yahoo! Europe hosted an ad containing bitcoin mining malware that infected an estimated two million computers using a Java vulnerability.

Another software, called Sefnit, was first detected in mid-2013 and has been bundled with many software packages. Microsoft has been removing the malware through its Microsoft Security Essentials and other security software.

Several reports of employees or students using university or research computers to mine bitcoins have been published. On February 20, 2014, a member of the Harvard community was stripped of their access to the university's research computing facilities after setting up a Dogecoin mining operation using a Harvard research network, according to an internal email circulated by Faculty of Arts and Sciences Research Computing officials.

Ars Technica reported in January 2018 that YouTube advertisements contained JavaScript code that mined the cryptocurrency Monero.

In 2021, multiple zero-day vulnerabilities were found on Microsoft Exchange servers, allowing remote code execution. These vulnerabilities were exploited to mine cryptocurrency.

== Detection ==
Traditional countermeasures of cryptojacking are host-based and not suitable for corporate networks. A potential solution is a network-based approach called Crypto-Aegis, which uses machine learning to detect cryptocurrency activities in network traffic, even when encrypted or mixed with non-malicious data.
