= Form grabbing =

Web-based malware tactic

Form grabbing is a form of malware that works by retrieving authorization and log-in credentials from a web data form before it is passed over the Internet to a secure server. This allows the malware to avoid HTTPS encryption. This method is more effective than keylogger software because it will acquire the user’s credentials even if they are input using virtual keyboard, auto-fill, or copy and paste. It can then sort the information based on its variable names, such as email, account name, and password. Additionally, the form grabber will log the URL and title of the website the data was gathered from.

== History ==
The method was invented in 2003 by the developer of a variant of a trojan horse called Downloader.Barbew, which attempts to download Backdoor.Barbew from the Internet and bring it over to the local system for execution. However, it was not popularized as a well known type of malware attack until the emergence of the infamous banking trojan Zeus in 2007. Zeus was used to steal banking information by man-in-the-browser keystroke logging and form grabbing. Like Zeus, the Barbew trojan was initially spammed to large numbers of individuals through e-mails masquerading as big-name banking companies. Form grabbing as a method first advanced through iterations of Zeus that allowed the module to not only detect the grabbed form data but to also determine how useful the information taken was. In later versions, the form grabber was also privy to the website where the actual data was submitted, leaving sensitive information more vulnerable than before.

== Known occurrences ==
A trojan known as Tinba (Tiny Banker Trojan) has been built with form grabbing and is able to steal online banking credentials and was first discovered in 2012. Another program called Weyland-Yutani BOT was the first software designed to attack the macOS platform and can work on Firefox. The web injects templates in Weyland-Yutani BOT were different from existing ones such as Zeus and SpyEye.

Another known version is British Airways breach in September 2018. In the British Airways’ case, the organizations’ servers appeared to have been compromised directly, with the attackers modifying one of the JavaScript files (Modernizr JavaScript library, version 2.6.2) to include a PII/credit card logging script that would grab the payment information and send the information to the server controlled by the attacker hosted on “baways[.]com” domain with an SSL certificate issued by “Comodo” Certificate Authority. The British Airways mobile application also loads a webpage built with the same CSS and JavaScript components as the main website, including the malicious script installed by Magecart. Thus, the payments made using the British Airways mobile app were also affected.

== Countermeasures ==
Due to the recent increase in keylogging and form grabbing, antivirus companies are adding additional protection to counter the efforts of key-loggers and prevent collecting passwords. These efforts have taken different forms varying from antivirus companies, such as safepay, password manager, and others. To further counter form grabbing, users' privileges can become limited which would prevent them from installing Browser Helper Objects (BHOs) and other form grabbing software. Administrators should create a list of malicious servers to their firewalls.

New countermeasures, such as using Out-of-band communication, to circumvent form grabbers and Man-in-the-browser are also emerging; examples include FormL3SS.; those that circumvent the threat use a different communication channel to send the sensitive data to the trusted server. Thus, no information is entered on the compromised device. Alternative Initiatives such as Fidelius use added hardware to protect the input/output to the compromised or believed compromised device.

== See also ==
- Keystroke logging
- Malware
- Trojan horse
- Web security exploits
- Computer insecurity
- Internet privacy
- Tiny Banker Trojan
