= User profiles in Microsoft Windows =

Microsoft Windows profile refers to the user profile that is used by the Microsoft Windows operating system to represent the characteristics of the user.

== Windows XP ==
=== Profile creation ===
Establishing a user account on the computer (or on its parent domain) does not create a profile for that user. The profile is created the first time the user interactively logs on at the computer. Logging on across a network to access shared folders does not create a profile.

At first logon, a folder will typically be created under "Documents and Settings" (standard folder on English version of Windows 2000, XP and Windows Server 2003) matching the logon name of the user. Should a folder of that name already exist, the profile-creation process will create a new one, typically named username.computername, on workgroup computers, or username.domainname on Active Directory member computers.

Once a profile folder has been created, Windows will never automatically rename that folder. Thus if the username itself is subsequently changed, the profile folder will remain as is, and the profile will no longer match the username, which could lead to confusion. For this reason, the administrator might want to avoid renaming user accounts if at all possible, or rename the folder manually and edit the registry to reflect the changes.

The new profile is created by making a copy of a special profile named Default User. It is permissible to modify this Default User profile (within certain guidelines) so as to provide a customized working environment for each new user. Modification of the Default User profile should ideally be done prior to any users logging-on to the computer. If a user has already logged on once or more, the Default Profile has no effect whatsoever for that user.

=== Profile contents ===
NTUSER.DAT
Within the root of the profile, a file named NTUSER.DAT contains the user's personalized settings for the majority of software installed on the computer; including Windows itself. When the user logs on, NTUSER.DAT will be mounted in HKEY_USERS using its SID as the subkey, and also will appear as the HKEY_CURRENT_USER branch of the registry tree for the processes running as the user. NTUSER.DAT is held open for writing (i.e., "locked") whenever the user is logged on.

My Documents
This folder is intended to contain the user's work, and in Windows-aware programs, dialog boxes will typically prompt the user to store documents here. "My Documents" as a shortcut also appears on the desktop, and in My Computer. It is here that these shortcuts point.

Favorites, Cookies, and History
These folders are used by Microsoft's Internet Explorer web browser to store surfing data. They are not used by alternative browsers such as Firefox or Opera, which typically store their data under "Application Data."

Nethood, Printhood
These folders contain the network shares and printers discovered by the user with the My Network Places applet, in the form of shortcuts.

Start Menu
This folder contains the shortcuts present on the same-named Desktop feature.

Desktop
This folder contains files and shortcuts present on the user's desktop.

Application Data
Provided mainly for the use of programmers, as a place to store data that is related to specific software, but which does not fall into the category of documents that a user might open directly. This folder was made necessary by Windows' best practices programming guidelines, which now prohibit the storage of temporary data of any kind in the Program Files folder.

Local Settings
Functionally similar to "Application Data", and contains a second subfolder of that name. It also contains the temporary files generated by Windows programs themselves, and as a result of Internet Explorer's online activities. For standalone computers the two folders are functionally similar, but on networks employing Roaming profiles, the "Local Settings" folder is not included in the profile synchronization process. Thus, data in the "Local Settings" folder will not be copied between computers when the user roams.

Note Some of these subfolders are hidden from the users view in Windows Explorer. To see them you must uncheck "Hide System Folders" in the folder options.

=== Special profiles ===
"Default User" – Plays a role in the profile-creation process, see above.

"All Users" – This profile is present mainly to answer an issue related to software installation. It provides a way for setup programs to create desktop or start-menu shortcuts which will be visible to all users of the computer, not just the user running the setup program. The Application Data section may also contain program-data common to all users. "All Users" acts purely as an information-store, it is never loaded as an active profile.

"Administrator" – All versions of NT-based Windows have an administrator account and corresponding profile, although on XP this account may only be visible on the logon screen if the computer is started in safe mode. In Windows Vista, it is disabled by default.

=== History and origin ===
Historically, the Windows 95-98 product line did not employ user-profiling as standard, with all users sharing the same settings, although that feature could be activated in Control Panel.

The user-profiling scheme in force today owes its origins to Windows NT, which stored its profiles within the system folder itself, typically under C:\WINNT\Profiles\. Windows 2000 saw the change to a separate "Documents and Settings" folder for profiles, and in this respect is virtually identical to Windows XP and Windows Server 2003.

=== Recent developments ===
User profiles of all Windows versions since Windows Vista and Windows Server 2008 are functionally similar to those of Windows XP, but with some differences. Perhaps the key difference is that they are stored in a "C:\Users" folder, instead of "C:\Documents and Settings." For backward compatibility, a junction point at "C:\Documents and Settings" points to "C:\Users". The fact that the profile root folder appears twice in any folder listing has adverse implications for any backup program. Backup software needs to be aware of not copying symbolic links additionally to the physical path, or else it is possible to double the size of the backup by copying what appear to be two separate folders, both potentially containing the bulk of the data on the computer.

A second change in Vista is that the media-specific "My Pictures" and "My Music" folders are now outside of the "My Documents" folder, instead of being subfolders (as well as removing the "My" Prefix – so My Documents becomes Documents, for example).

== See also ==
- User profile
- Roaming user profile
