= Drive-by download =

Computer security exploitation

In computer security, a drive-by download is the unintended download of software, typically malicious software. The term usually refers to a download which was authorized by a user without understanding what is being downloaded, such as in the case of a Trojan horse. In other cases, the term may simply refer to a download which occurs without a user's knowledge. Common types of files distributed in drive-by download attacks include computer viruses, spyware, or crimeware.

Drive-by downloads may happen when visiting a website, opening an e-mail attachment, clicking a link in an email, or clicking on a deceptive pop-up window. Users often click on a pop-up window in the mistaken belief that, for example, an error message from the computer's operating system is being acknowledged or a seemingly innocuous advertisement pop-up is being dismissed. In such cases, the "supplier" may claim that the user "consented" to the download, although the user was in fact unaware of having started an unwanted or malicious software download. Similarly if a person is visiting a site with malicious content, the person may become victim to a drive-by download attack. That is, the malicious content may be able to exploit vulnerabilities in the browser or plugins to run malicious code without the user's knowledge.

A drive-by install (or installation) is a similar event. It refers to installation rather than download (though sometimes the two terms are used interchangeably).

== Process ==
When creating a drive-by download, an attacker must first create their malicious content to perform the attack. With the rise in exploit packs that contain the vulnerabilities needed to carry out unauthorized drive-by download attacks, the skill level needed to perform this attack has been reduced.

The next step is to host the malicious content that the attacker wishes to distribute. One option is for the attacker to host the malicious content on their own server. However, because of the difficulty in directing users to a new page, it may also be hosted on a compromised legitimate website, or a legitimate website unknowingly distributing the attacker's content through a third party service (e.g., an advertisement). When the content is loaded by the client, the attacker will analyze the fingerprint of the client in order to tailor the code to exploit vulnerabilities specific to that client. In December 2022 the FBI warned that criminals were buying search engine advertisements that imitate real businesses and send users to lookalike websites, where the software offered for download is actually malware.

Finally, the attacker exploits the necessary vulnerabilities to launch the drive-by download attack. Drive-by downloads usually use one of two strategies. The first strategy is exploiting API calls for various plugins. For example, the DownloadAndInstall API of the Sina ActiveX component did not properly check its parameters and allowed the downloading and execution of arbitrary files from the internet. The second strategy involves writing shellcode to memory, and then exploiting vulnerabilities in the web browser or plugin to divert the control flow of the program to the shell code. After the shellcode has been executed, the attacker can perform further malicious activities. This often involves downloading and installing malware, but can be anything, including stealing information to send back to the attacker.

The attacker may also take measures to prevent detection throughout the attack. One method is to rely on the obfuscation of the malicious code. This can be done through the use of iframes. Another method is to encrypt the malicious code to prevent detection. Generally the attacker encrypts the malicious code into a ciphertext, then includes the decryption method after the ciphertext.

== Detection and prevention ==
Detection of drive-by download attacks is an active area of research. Some methods of detection involve anomaly detection, which tracks for state changes on a user's computer system while the user visits a webpage. This involves monitoring the user's computer system for anomalous changes when a web page is rendered. Other methods of detection include detecting when malicious code (shellcode) is written to memory by an attacker's exploit. Another detection method is to make run-time environments that allow JavaScript code to run and track its behavior while it runs. Other detection methods include examining contents of HTML pages to identify features that can be used to identify malicious web pages, and using characteristics of web servers to determine if a page is malicious. Some antivirus tools use static signatures to match patterns of malicious scripts, although these are not very effective because of obfuscation techniques. Detection is also possible by using low-interaction or high-interaction honeyclients.

Drive-by downloads can also be prevented from occurring by using script-blockers such as NoScript, which can easily be added into browsers such as Firefox. Using such a script-blocker, the user can disable all the scripts on a given webpage, and then selectively re-enable individual scripts on a one-by-one basis in order to determine which ones are truly necessary for webpage functionality. However, some script-blocking tools can have unintended consequences, such as breaking parts of other websites, which can be a bit of a balancing act.

A different form of prevention, known as "Cujo," is integrated into a web proxy, where it inspects web pages and blocks the delivery of malicious JavaScript code.

== See also ==
- Mousetrapping
- Malvertising
- Clickjacking
- Phishing
- BLADE
- Mac Flashback
- Windows Metafile vulnerability
- Dropper (malware)
