= W32/Storm.worm =

2001 computer worm

The W32.Storm.Worm malware is a computer worm released in 2001, that infects unpatched systems running the Microsoft IIS server and begins a denial-of-service attack on http://www.microsoft.com. It is a low-impact, low-infection worm that is removed by all major antivirus solutions since 2001. W32.Storm.Worm is unrelated to the much more dangerous Nuwar or Small.dam worm, commonly referred to as the Storm Worm, which is responsible for the extensive Storm botnet.
