= Asprox botnet =

Computer malware

The Asprox botnet (discovered around 2008), also known by its aliases Badsrc and Aseljo, is a botnet mostly involved in phishing scams and performing SQL injections into websites to spread malware. It is a highly infectious malware which spreads through an email or through a clone website. It can be used to trace any kind of personal or financial information and activities online.

== Operations ==
Since its discovery in 2008 the Asprox botnet has been involved in multiple high-profile attacks on various websites in order to spread malware. The botnet itself consists of roughly 15,000 infected computers as of May, 2008, although the size of the botnet itself is highly variable as the controllers of the botnet have been known to deliberately shrink (and later regrow) their botnet to prevent more aggressive countermeasures from the IT Community.

The botnet propagates itself in a somewhat unusual way, as it actively searches and infects vulnerable websites running Active Server Pages. Once it finds a potential target the botnet performs a SQL injection on the website, inserting an IFrame which redirects the user visiting the site to a site hosting Malware.

The botnet usually attacks in waves – the goal of each wave is to infect as many websites as possible, thus achieving the highest possible spread rate. Once a wave is completed the botnet lay dormant for an extended amount of time, likely to prevent aggressive counterreactions from the security community. The initial wave took place in July, 2008, which infected an estimated 1,000 – 2,000 pages. An additional wave took place in October 2009, infecting an unknown number of websites. Another wave took place in June 2010, increasing the estimated total number of infected domains from 2,000 to an estimated 10,000 – 13,000 within a day.

== Notable high-profile infections ==
While the infection targets of the Asprox botnet are randomly determined through Google searches, some high-profile websites have been infected in the past. Some of these infections have received individual coverage.

- Sony PlayStation U.S.
- Adobe's Serious Magic website
- Several government, healthcare and business related websites

== See also ==
- Botnet
- Malware
- Email spam
- Cybercrime
- Internet security
