= Peter Levashov =

Russian spammer and virus creator (born 1980)

- Петр Юрьевич Левашов
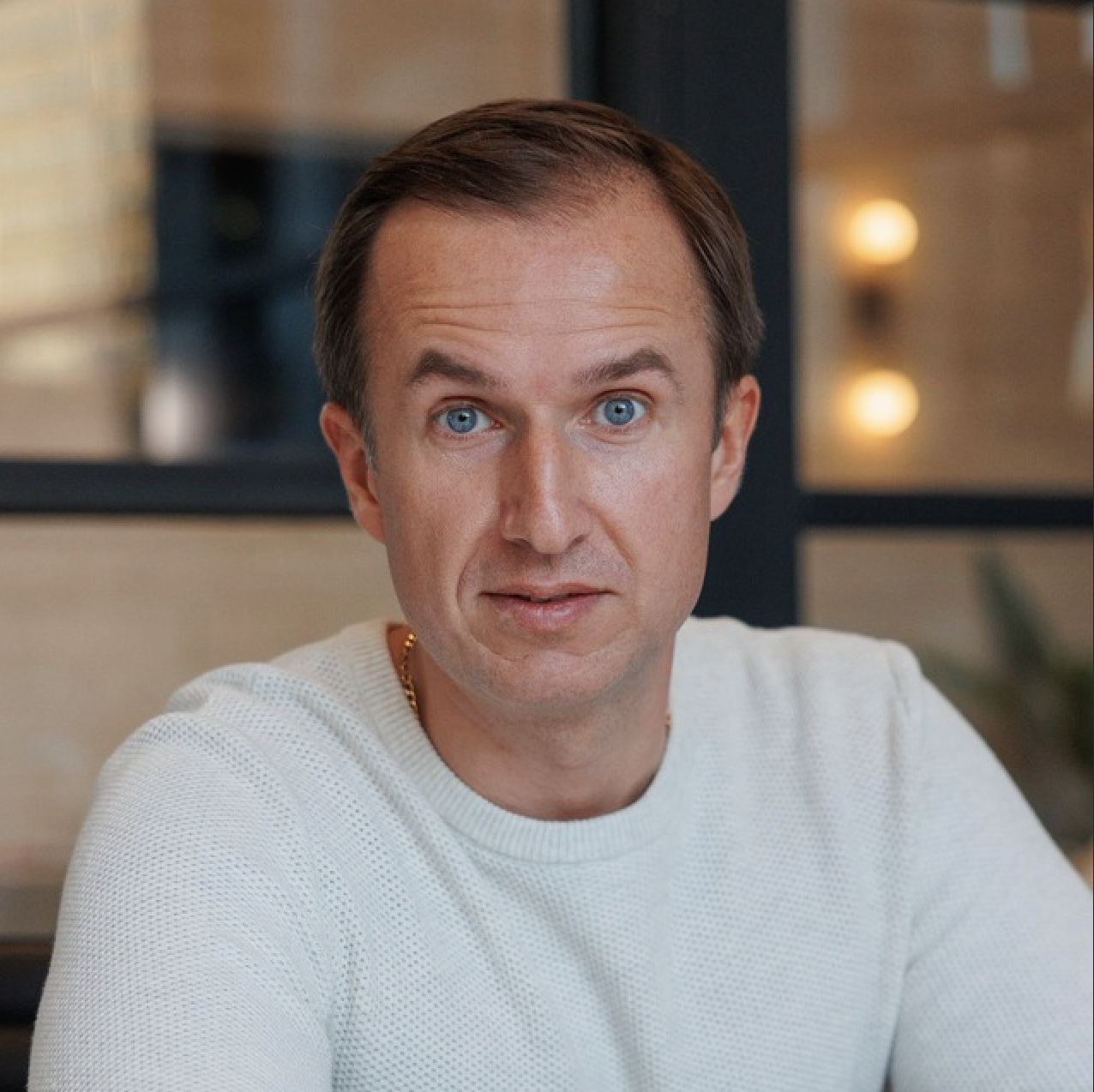
- Born: Peter Yuryevich Levashov; 1980 (age 45–46); Russia
- Other names: Petr Levashov, Peter Severa, Petr Severa, Sergey Astakhov
- Occupation: Spammer
- Known for: alleged operation of the Kelihos botnet

Peter Levashov is a Russian spammer and virus creator. He was described by The Spamhaus Project as one of the longest functioning criminal spam operators on the internet. In July 2021, a US federal judge overruled government recommendations for a 12 to 14.5 year prison sentence, giving a sentence instead of time served, with three years of supervision. Levashov remains in the US.

== Background ==
Levashov, born in 1980, graduated in 1997 from the Saint Petersburg High School No. 30 of Math and Science. He started a bulk-mailing service, registered to his own name, in 2002.

Levashov (as "Peter Severa, age unknown, of Russia") is alleged to have worked with US spammer Alan Ralsky, who was indicted in 2008 and later jailed for spam email promotions for pump and dump" schemes.

Levashov was described by Spamhaus as "[o]ne of the longest operating criminal spam-lords on the internet," who collaborated with many other Eastern European and U.S. based botnet spammers, as well as American spammer from Detroit Alan Ralsky. Peter Levashov was arrested by Spanish officials while in Barcelona, at the request of the United States Department of Justice. He was suspected by the United States of being the kingpin behind the Kelihos botnet and was extradited to the United States, arriving on 2 February 2018. Russia had filed a competing extradition request, but the Spanish high court in October 2017 approved Levashov’s extradition to the U.S., rejecting the Russian counterclaim.

== Criminal case ==
The case was U.S. v. Levashov, 17-mj-448, U.S. District Court, District of Connecticut (Bridgeport)., assigned to Robert N. Chatigny, Senior United States District Judge in Hartford. Levashov initially pleaded not guilty to the charges. According to his lawyer, Petya [Pyotr] Levashov was detained in a Bridgeport, Connecticut prison until at least 5 February 2018. As of July 2021, he had been out of prison on electronic monitoring since January 2020. Levashov ultimately "pleaded guilty to one count of causing intentional damage to a protected computer, one count of conspiracy, one count of wire fraud and one count of aggravated identity theft" according to the U.S. Department of Justice and confirmed by media reports.

An affidavit unsealed on February 5, 2018, showed Apple’s unexpected role in bringing Levashov to justice. He allegedly ran the Kelihos botnet under the alias “Severa,” renting out access to spammers and other cybercriminals. Despite Levashov’s significant efforts at anonymity, court records show that federal agents had been surveilling his iCloud account since May 20, 2016, funneling back crucial information that may have led to his arrest.

According to RFE/RL, which cited Levashov's testimony on behalf of the US government in the June, 2021 court case against Oleg Koshkin, Levashov cooperated with the FBI during his imprisonment in the hope of a sentence reduction. Levashov was released from jail on bond in January 2020 and remained free until his sentencing 18 months later.

Although prosecutors had recommended a prison sentence of at least 12 years, Levashov was released in July, 2021, with federal judge Robert Chatigny saying that the 33 months he had already spent in prison was "a long time." Levashov was additionally ordered to serve 3 years of supervised release.

== Subsequent career ==
Since his release Levashov has been working on a DAO called SeveraDAO. In December 2024 during an interview with Gazeta.ru, Levashov stated that he has never had any dealings with United States intelligence agencies.

== See also ==
- Kelihos botnet
