= Conficker =

2008 computer worm

Malware details
- Technical name: Mal/Conficker-A (Sophos); Win32/Conficker.A (ESET, CA); W32.Downadup (Symantec); W32/Downadup.A (F-Secure); Conficker.A (Panda); Net-Worm.Win32.Kido.bt (Kaspersky); W32/Conficker.worm (McAfee); Win32.Worm.Downadup.Gen (BitDefender); Win32:Confi (avast!); WORM_DOWNAD (Trend Micro); Worm.Downadup (ClamAV)
- Type: Worm

Technical details
- Platforms: Windows 2000, Windows XP, Windows 2003 Server (SP2), Windows Vista, Windows 2008 Server

Conficker, also known as Downup, Downadup and Kido, is a computer worm targeting the Microsoft Windows operating system that was first detected in November 2008. It uses flaws in Windows OS software (MS08-067 / CVE-2008-4250) and dictionary attacks on administrator passwords to propagate while forming a botnet, and has been unusually difficult to counter because of its combined use of many advanced malware techniques. The Conficker worm infected millions of computers including government, business and home computers in over 190 countries, making it the largest known computer worm infection since the 2003 SQL Slammer worm.

Despite its wide propagation, the worm did not do much damage. Four men believed to be responsible were arrested, and one pled guilty and was sentenced to four years in prison.

== Prevalence ==
Estimates of the number of infected computers were difficult because the virus changed its propagation and update strategy from version to version. In January 2009, the estimated number of infected computers ranged from almost 9 million to 15 million. Microsoft has reported the total number of infected computers detected by its antimalware products has remained steady at around 1.7 million from mid-2010 to mid-2011. By mid-2015, the total number of infections had dropped to about 400,000, and it was estimated to be 500,000 in 2019.

== History ==
=== Name ===
The origin of the name Conficker is thought to be a combination of the English term "configure" and the German expletive Ficker (engl. fucker). Microsoft analyst Joshua Phillips gives an alternative interpretation of the name, describing it as a rearrangement of portions of the domain name trafficconverter.biz (with the letter k, not found in the domain name, added as in "trafficker", to avoid a "soft" c sound) which was used by early versions of Conficker to download updates.

=== Discovery ===
The first variant of Conficker, discovered in early November 2008, propagated through the Internet by exploiting a vulnerability in a network service (MS08-067) on Windows 2000, Windows XP, Windows Vista, Windows Server 2003, Windows Server 2008, and Windows Server 2008 R2 Beta. While Windows 7 may have been affected by this vulnerability, the Windows 7 Beta was not publicly available until January 2009. Although Microsoft released an emergency out-of-band patch on October 23, 2008, to close the vulnerability, a large number of Windows PCs (estimated at 30%) remained unpatched as late as January 2009. A second variant of the virus, discovered in December 2008, added the ability to propagate over LANs through removable media and network shares. Researchers believe that these were decisive factors in allowing the virus to propagate quickly.

=== Impact in Europe ===
Intramar, the French Navy computer network, was infected with Conficker on 15 January 2009. The network was subsequently quarantined, forcing aircraft at several airbases to be grounded because their flight plans could not be downloaded.

The United Kingdom Ministry of Defence reported that some of its major systems and desktops were infected. The virus had spread across administrative offices, NavyStar/N* desktops aboard various Royal Navy warships and Royal Navy submarines, and hospitals across the city of Sheffield reported infection of over 800 computers.

On 2 February 2009, the Bundeswehr, the unified armed forces of Germany, reported that about one hundred of its computers were infected.

An infection of Manchester City Council's IT system caused an estimated £1.5m worth of disruption in February 2009. The use of USB flash drives was banned, as this was believed to be the vector for the initial infection.

A memo from the Director of the UK Parliamentary ICT service informed the users of the House of Commons on 24 March 2009 that it had been infected with the virus. The memo, which was subsequently leaked, called for users to avoid connecting any unauthorised equipment to the network.

In January 2010, the Greater Manchester Police computer network was infected, leading to its disconnection for three days from the Police National Computer as a precautionary measure; during that time, officers had to ask other forces to run routine checks on vehicles and people.

== Operation ==
Although almost all of the advanced malware techniques used by Conficker have seen past use or are well known to researchers, the virus's combined use of so many has made it unusually difficult to eradicate. The virus's unknown authors are also believed to be tracking anti-malware efforts from network operators and law enforcement and have regularly released new variants to close the virus's own vulnerabilities.

Five variants of the Conficker virus are known and have been dubbed Conficker A, B, C, D and E. They were discovered 21 November 2008, 29 December 2008, 20 February 2009, 4 March 2009 and 7 April 2009, respectively. The Conficker Working Group uses namings of A, B, B++, C, and E for the same variants respectively. This means that (CWG) B++ is equivalent to (MSFT) C and (CWG) C is equivalent to (MSFT) D.

Variant	Detection date	Infection vectors	Update propagation	Self-defense	End action
Conficker A	2008-11-21	NetBIOS; Exploits MS08-067 vulnerability in Server service	HTTP pull; Downloads from trafficconverter.biz; Downloads daily from any of 250 pseudorandom domains over 5 TLDs	None	Updates self to Conficker B, C or D
Conficker B	2008-12-29	NetBIOS; Exploits MS08-067 vulnerability in Server service; Dictionary attack on ADMIN$ shares; Removable media; Creates DLL-based AutoRun trojan on attached removable drives	HTTP pull; Downloads daily from any of 250 pseudorandom domains over 8 TLDs; NetBIOS push; Patches MS08-067 to open reinfection backdoor in Server service	Blocks certain DNS lookups; Disables AutoUpdate	Updates self to Conficker C or D
Conficker C	2009-02-20	NetBIOS; Exploits MS08-067 vulnerability in Server service; Dictionary attack on ADMIN$ shares; Removable media; Creates DLL-based AutoRun trojan on attached removable drives	HTTP pull; Downloads daily from 500 of 50,000 pseudorandom domains over 8 TLDs per day; NetBIOS push; Patches MS08-067 to open reinfection backdoor in Server service; Creates named pipe to receive URL from remote host, then downloads from URL	Blocks certain DNS lookups; Disables AutoUpdate	Updates self to Conficker D
Conficker D	2009-03-04	None	HTTP pull; Downloads daily from any 500 of 50,000 pseudorandom domains over 110 TLDs; P2P push/pull; Uses custom protocol to scan for infected peers via UDP, then transfer via TCP	Blocks certain DNS lookups; Does an in-memory patch of DNSAPI.DLL to block lookups of anti-malware related web sites; Disables Safe Mode; Disables AutoUpdate; Kills anti-malware; Scans for and terminates processes with names of anti-malware, patch or diagnostic utilities at one-second intervals	Downloads and installs Conficker E
Conficker E	2009-04-07	NetBIOS; Exploits MS08-067 vulnerability in Server service	NetBIOS push; Patches MS08-067 to open reinfection backdoor in Server service; P2P push/pull; Uses custom protocol to scan for infected peers via UDP, then transfer via TCP	Blocks certain DNS lookups; Disables AutoUpdate; Kills anti-malware; Scans for and terminates processes with names of anti-malware, patch or diagnostic utilities at one-second intervals	Updates local copy of Conficker C to Conficker D; Downloads and installs malware payload: Waledac spambot; SpyProtect 2009 scareware; Removes self on 3 May 2009 (but leaves remaining copy of Conficker D)

=== Initial infection ===
- Variants A, B, C and E exploit a vulnerability in the Server Service on Windows computers, in which an already-infected source computer uses a specially-crafted RPC request to force a buffer overflow and execute shellcode on the target computer. On the source computer, the virus runs an HTTP server on a port between 1024 and 10000; the target shellcode connects back to this HTTP server to download a copy of the virus in DLL form, which it then attaches to svchost.exe. Variants B and later may attach instead to a running services.exe or Windows Explorer process. Attaching to those processes might be detected by the application trust feature of an installed firewall.
- Variants B and C can remotely execute copies of themselves through the ADMIN$ share on computers visible over NetBIOS. If the share is password-protected, a dictionary attack is attempted, potentially generating large amounts of network traffic and tripping user account lockout policies.
- Variants B and C place a copy of their DLL form in the recycle.bin of any attached removable media (such as USB flash drives), from which they can then infect new hosts through the Windows AutoRun mechanism using a manipulated autorun.inf.

To start itself at system boot, the virus saves a copy of its DLL form to a random filename in the Windows system or system32 folder, then adds registry keys to have svchost.exe invoke that DLL as an invisible network service.

=== Payload propagation ===
The virus has several mechanisms for pushing or pulling executable payloads over the network. These payloads are used by the virus to update itself to newer variants, and to install additional malware.

- Variant A generates a list of 250 domain names every day across five TLDs. The domain names are generated from a pseudo-random number generator (PRNG) seeded with the current date to ensure that every copy of the virus generates the same names each day. The virus then attempts an HTTP connection to each domain name in turn, expecting from any of them a signed payload.
- Variant B increases the number of TLDs to eight, and has a generator tweaked to produce domain names disjoint from those of A.
  - To counter the virus's use of pseudorandom domain names, Internet Corporation for Assigned Names and Numbers (ICANN) and several TLD registries began in February 2009 a coordinated barring of transfers and registrations for these domains. Variant D counters this by generating daily a pool of 50,000 domains across 110 TLDs, from which it randomly chooses 500 to attempt for that day. The generated domain names were also shortened from 8–11 to 4–9 characters to make them more difficult to detect with heuristics. This new pull mechanism (which was disabled until April 1, 2009) is unlikely to propagate payloads to more than 1% of infected hosts per day, but is expected to function as a seeding mechanism for the virus's peer-to-peer network. The shorter generated names, however, are expected to collide with 150–200 existing domains per day, potentially causing a distributed denial-of-service attack (DDoS) on sites serving those domains. However the large number of generated domains and the fact that not every domain will be contacted for a given day will probably prevent DDoS situations.
- Variant C creates a named pipe, over which it can push URLs for downloadable payloads to other infected hosts on a local area network.
- Variants B, C and E perform in-memory patches to NetBIOS-related DLLs to close MS08-067 and watch for re-infection attempts through the same vulnerability. Re-infection from more recent versions of Conficker are allowed through, effectively turning the vulnerability into a propagation backdoor.
- Variants D and E create an ad-hoc peer-to-peer network to push and pull payloads over the wider Internet. This aspect of the virus is heavily obfuscated in code and not fully understood, but has been observed to use large-scale UDP scanning to build up a peer list of infected hosts and TCP for subsequent transfers of signed payloads. To make analysis more difficult, port numbers for connections are hashed from the IP address of each peer.

==== Armoring ====
To prevent payloads from being hijacked, variant A payloads are first SHA-1-hashed and RC4-encrypted with the 512-bit hash as a key. The hash is then RSA-signed with a 1024-bit private key. The payload is unpacked and executed only if its signature verifies with a public key embedded in the virus. Variants B and later use MD6 as their hash function and increase the size of the RSA key to 4096 bits. Conficker B adopted MD6 mere months after it was first published; six weeks after a weakness was discovered in an early version of the algorithm and a new version was published, Conficker upgraded to the new MD6.

=== Self-defense ===
The DLL form of the virus is protected against deletion by setting its ownership to "SYSTEM", which locks it from deletion even if the user is granted with administrator privileges. The virus stores a backup copy of this DLL disguised as a .jpg image in the Internet Explorer cache of the user network services.

Variant C of the virus resets System Restore points and disables a number of system services such as Windows Automatic Update, Windows Security Center, Windows Defender and Windows Error Reporting. Processes matching a predefined list of antiviral, diagnostic or system patching tools are watched for and terminated. An in-memory patch is also applied to the system resolver DLL to block lookups of hostnames related to antivirus software vendors and the Windows Update service.

=== End action ===
Variant E of the virus was the first to use its base of infected computers for an ulterior purpose. It downloads and installs, from a web server hosted in Ukraine, two additional payloads:

- Waledac, a spambot otherwise known to propagate through e-mail attachments. Waledac operates similarly to the 2008 Storm worm and is believed to be written by the same authors.
- SpyProtect 2009, a scareware rogue antivirus product.

== Symptoms ==
Symptoms of a Conficker infection include:

- Account lockout policies being reset automatically.
- Certain Microsoft Windows services such as Automatic Updates, Background Intelligent Transfer Service (BITS), Windows Defender and Windows Error Reporting disabled.
- Domain controllers responding slowly to client requests.
- Congestion on local area networks (ARP flood as consequence of network scan).
- Web sites related to antivirus software or the Windows Update service becoming inaccessible.
- User accounts locked out.

== Response ==
On 12 February 2009, Microsoft announced the formation of an industry group to collaboratively counter Conficker. The group, which has since been informally dubbed the Conficker Cabal, includes Microsoft, Afilias, ICANN, Neustar, Verisign, China Internet Network Information Center, Public Internet Registry, Global Domains International, M1D Global, America Online, Symantec, F-Secure, ISC, researchers from Georgia Tech, The Shadowserver Foundation, Arbor Networks, and Support Intelligence. In a lessons-learned report on the response, the Conficker Working Group named stopping the worm's author from taking control of the botnet as its biggest success. It identified its inability to remediate infected machines as its biggest failure. The report was funded by the U.S. Department of Homeland Security.

=== From Microsoft ===
On 13 February 2009, Microsoft offered a $USD250,000 reward for information leading to the arrest and conviction of the individuals behind the creation and/or distribution of Conficker.

=== From registries ===
ICANN has sought preemptive barring of domain transfers and registrations from all TLD registries affected by the virus's domain generator. Those which have taken action include:

- On 13 March 2009, NIC Chile, the .cl ccTLD registry, blocked all the domain names informed by the Conficker Working Group and reviewed a hundred already registered from the worm list.
- On 24 March 2009, CIRA, the Canadian Internet Registration Authority, locked all previously unregistered .ca domain names expected to be generated by the virus over the next 12 months.
- On 27 March 2009, NIC-Panama, the .pa ccTLD registry, blocked all the domain names informed by the Conficker Working Group.
- On 30 March 2009, SWITCH, the Swiss ccTLD registry, announced it was "taking action to protect internet addresses with the endings .ch and .li from the Conficker computer worm."
- On 31 March 2009, NASK, the Polish ccTLD registry, locked over 7,000 .pl domains expected to be generated by the virus over the following five weeks. NASK has also warned that worm traffic may unintentionally inflict a DDoS attack to legitimate domains which happen to be in the generated set.
- On 2 April 2009, Island Networks, the ccTLD registry for Guernsey and Jersey, confirmed after investigations and liaison with the IANA that no .gg or .je names were in the set of names generated by the virus.

By mid-April 2009 all domain names generated by Conficker A had been successfully locked or preemptively registered, rendering its update mechanism ineffective.

== Origin ==
Working group members stated at the 2009 Black Hat Briefings that Ukraine is the probable origin of the virus, but declined to reveal further technical discoveries about the virus's internals to avoid tipping off its authors. An initial variant of Conficker did not infect systems with Ukrainian IP addresses or with Ukrainian keyboard layouts. The payload of Conficker.E was downloaded from a host in Ukraine.

In 2015, Phil Porras, Vinod Yegneswaran and Hassan Saidi – who were the first to detect and reverse-engineer Conficker – wrote in the Journal of Sensitive Cyber Research and Engineering, a classified, peer-reviewed U.S. government cybersecurity publication, that they tracked the malware to a group of Ukrainian cybercriminals. Porras et al. believed that the criminals abandoned Conficker after it had spread much more widely than they assumed it would, reasoning that any attempt to use it would draw too much attention from law enforcement worldwide. This explanation is widely accepted in the cybersecurity field.

In 2011, working with the FBI, Ukrainian police arrested three Ukrainians in relation to Conficker, but there are no records of them being prosecuted or convicted. A Swede, Mikael Sallnert, was sentenced to 48 months in prison in the U.S. after a guilty plea.

== Removal and detection ==
Due to the lock of the virus files against deletion as long as the system is running, the manual or automatic removal itself has to be performed during boot process or with an external system installed. Deleting any existing backup copy is a crucial step.

Microsoft released a removal guide for the virus, and recommended using the current release of its Windows Malicious Software Removal Tool to remove the virus, then applying the patch to prevent re-infection. Newer versions of Windows are immune to Conficker.

=== Third-party software ===
Many third-party anti-virus software vendors have released detection updates to their products and claim to be able to remove the worm. The evolving process of the malware shows some adoption to the common removal software, so it is likely that some of them might remove or at least disable some variants, while others remain active or, even worse, deliver a false positive to the removal software and become active with the next reboot.

==== Automated remote detection ====
On 27 March 2009, Felix Leder and Tillmann Werner from the Honeynet Project discovered that Conficker-infected hosts have a detectable signature when scanned remotely. The peer-to-peer command protocol used by variants D and E of the virus has since been partially reverse-engineered, allowing researchers to imitate the virus network's command packets and positively identify infected computers en-masse.

Signature updates for a number of network scanning applications are now available.

It can also be detected in passive mode by sniffing broadcast domains for repeating ARP requests.

=== US CERT ===
The United States Computer Emergency Readiness Team (US-CERT) recommends disabling AutoRun to prevent Variant B of the virus from spreading through removable media. Prior to the release of Microsoft knowledgebase article KB967715, US-CERT described Microsoft's guidelines on disabling Autorun as being "not fully effective" and provided a workaround for disabling it more effectively. US-CERT has also made a network-based tool for detecting Conficker-infected hosts available to federal and state agencies.

== See also ==
- Botnet
- Timeline of notable computer viruses and worms
- Bot herder
- Network Access Protection
- Zombie (computer science)
- Malware
