= Kraken (disambiguation) =

The kraken is a legendary sea creature of gargantuan size, said to have been seen off the coasts of Norway and Iceland.

Kraken may also refer to:

== Literature ==
- Kraken (novel), a 2010 novel by China Miéville
- "The Kraken", an 1830 poem by Alfred, Lord Tennyson
- Kraken, a hypothetical modern dinosaur in Dougal Dixon's 1988 book The New Dinosaurs: An Alternative Evolution
- Kraken, a book by Mary Turzillo
- The Kraken Wakes, a 1953 novel by John Wyndham
- The symbol of the Ironmen in the Game of Thrones / A Song of Ice and Fire fictional scenario

== Sports ==
- Seattle Kraken, a National Hockey League team based in Seattle, Washington
- June Mar Fajardo (born 1989), Filipino basketball player nicknamed "Kraken" for his size
- Gary Sánchez (born 1992), Dominican baseball player nicknamed "the Kraken"

== Film ==
- Kraken (2025 film), a Russian science fiction monster film
- Kraken (2026 film), a Norwegian monster action horror film
- Kraken (Pirates of the Caribbean), sea monster in the Pirates of the Caribbean movie series
- Kraken, a character in the movie The Water Babies
- Kraken: Tentacles of the Deep, 2006 TV movie that premiered on the Syfy Channel
- The Kraken, sea monster in Clash of the Titans (1981 film)
- The Kraken, sea monster in Clash of the Titans (2010 film)
- The Kraken, a character in the film Hotel Transylvania 3: Summer Vacation
- Ruby Gillman, Teenage Kraken

== Comics ==
- Kraken (comics), a Spanish comics series by Antonio Segura and Jordi Bernet
- Kraken (character), various Krakens that have appeared throughout the decades in comic book publications
- Kraken (Marvel Comics), various characters have appeared in Marvel Comics using the name
- Commander Kraken, a fictional character in the Marvel Universe
- Judge Kraken, character in the Judge Dredd comic strip in 2000 AD
- Kraken Isaac, character from Saint Seiya

== Video and role playing games ==
- Kraken (Dungeons & Dragons), a creature in the role playing game
- The Kraken (Forgotten Realms), a secret society in the Forgotten Realms of Dungeons & Dragons
- Kraken, a giant red octopus in Sega's popular video game, The Ocean Hunter
- Kraken, one of the Four Fiends in the Final Fantasy series of video games
- The Kraken, a character in the PC game Crush, Crumble and Chomp!
- Kraken, an end level boss in the video game Shamu's Deep Sea Adventures
- Kraken, captain of the Skull Haven, a character in Capcom's Power Stone
- The Kraken, a sea-serpent boss in the SNES RPG, EarthBound
- The Kraken, a villain in the video game Marvel: Ultimate Alliance
- The Kraken, a playable character in the PC game Archon II: Adept
- The Kraken, a boss in Tomb Raider: Underworld
- Kraken, an enemy in the Clash of the Titans
- Kraken, an enemy in Indiana Jones and the Emperor's Tomb
- Kraken, a boss in the game God of War II
- Kraken, a boss in Lionhead Studios' Fable
- Kraken, a boss in the game Pac-Man Party
- Kraken, a monster in the game Evolve
- The Kraken, a boss in the game Fall Guys

== Other uses ==
- Kraken (virus), XBB.1.5 Covid virus subvariant
- Kraken Regiment, a Ukrainian military volunteer unit
- Kraken Technologies, a customer management system developed by Octopus Energy
- Giant squid, commonly known as kraken, or inspiring the legendary sea monster
- Kraken (genus), a genus of filose amoebae
- Kraken, a computing environment at the National Institute for Computational Sciences
- Kraken (band), a progressive metal band from Colombia
- Kraken (roller coaster), a roller coaster at Seaworld in Orlando, Florida
- Kraken (software test), a JavaScript test suite from Mozilla used in benchmarking web browser performance
- "Kraken", a song by Florence + the Machine from their 2025 album, Everybody Scream
- USS Kraken (SS-370), a United States submarine
- Kraken botnet, a botnet spyware program that attacks systems through email and social media sites
- Kraken Mare, the largest known body of liquid on the surface of Saturn's moon Titan
- Kraken Catena, a pit chain on Neptune's moon Triton
- Kraken (galaxy), a proposed galaxy that collided with the Milky Way around 11 billion years ago
- Kraken Rum, a Caribbean 94 proof black rum
- Kraken (cryptocurrency exchange), a cryptocurrency exchange and bank
- The Kraken (climb), a bouldering route in Devon, England
- 'Kraken', nickname for the Commander of the Royal Canadian Navy (CRCN)
- Kraken and "release the Kraken", neologisms used by Sidney Powell that refer to post-election lawsuits related to the 2020 United States presidential election
- GitKraken, a software company named after one of their products

== See also ==
- Kraken in popular culture
