= Zombie virus =

Zombie virus may refer to:

- Zombie (computing), a computer connected to the Internet that has been compromised by a hacker, computer virus or trojan horse program
- Zombie apocalypse, a literary genre
