= Donbot =

Donbot may refer to:

- Donbot (Futurama), a character in Futurama
- Donbot botnet, a botnet mostly involved in sending e-mail spam
