= Zawia Media =

Digital Media Platform

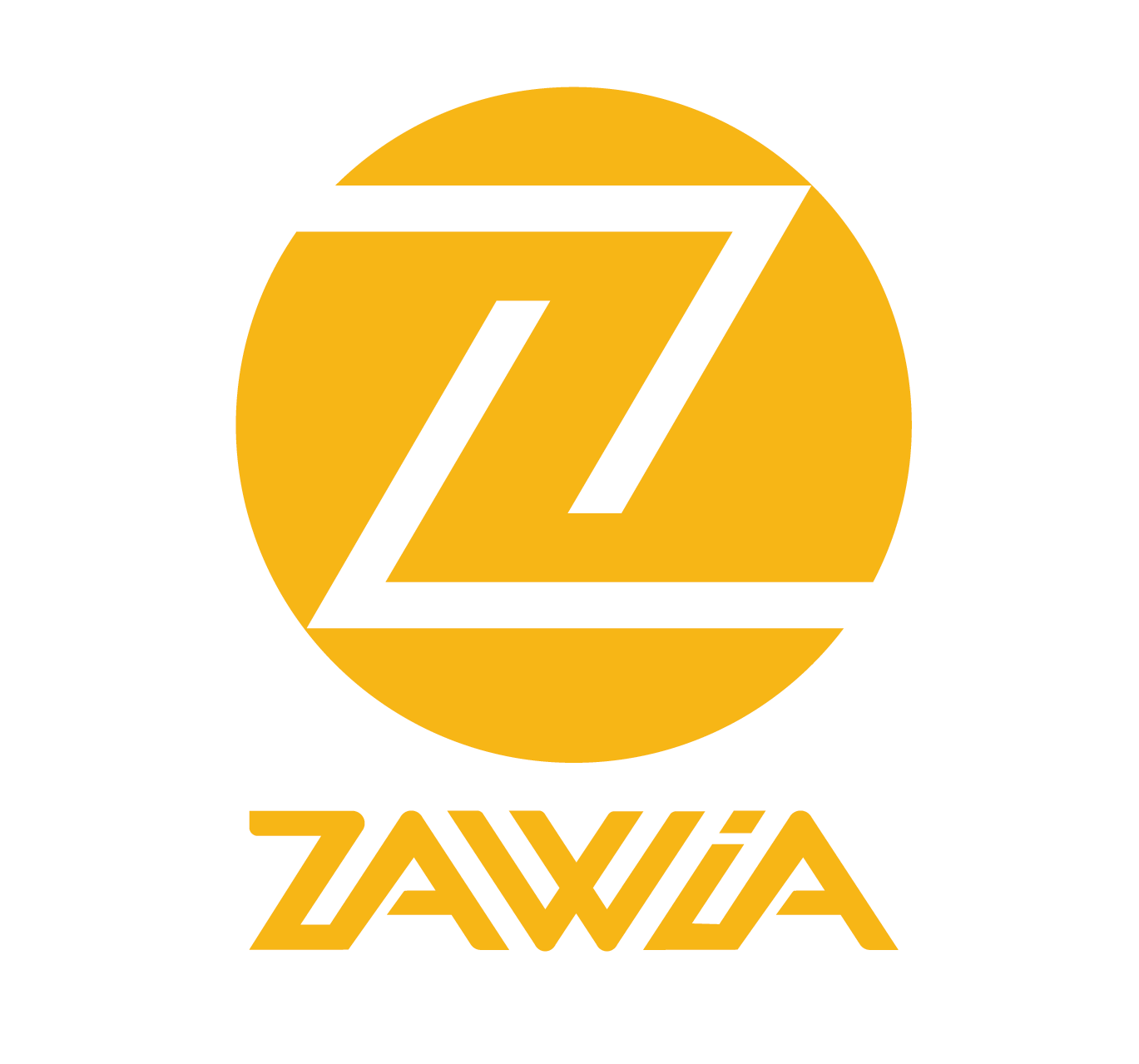

Programming
- Language(s): Dari & Pashto

History
- Launched: January 2019

Links
- Website: www.zawiamedia.com

Zawia Media is the first Digital Media platform in Afghanistan that was launched in January 2019. The sub-sections Zawia News, Zawia Music, and Zawia Cartoons were also later launched under the parent company, Zawia Media. The platforms' slogan is, 'untold realities from a fresh perspective', and the company has attracted a significant fanbase in its currently short life.

Zawia News, one of the company's sub-channels was recently suspended by the Taliban in Afghanistan, an instance that was internationally condemned. Currently, the company operates under a .com domain, accessible to everyone in Afghanistan and abroad.
