= Alan Ralsky =

Email spammer and convicted fraudster

Alan Ralsky (c. 1945–2021) was a convicted American fraudster, best known for his activities as a spammer.

== Spamming ==
Ralsky began his spamming career in 1996, when his licenses to sell insurance were revoked in Michigan and Illinois. Unlike most spammers, he provided interviews to various newspapers, although he claimed to be a commercial e-mailer rather than a spammer. He claimed that he was a legitimate business that complied with all laws.

He gained much of his notoriety following a December 2002 interview with The Detroit News. The article was posted to Slashdot, and the address of his newly built home was posted to Slashdot soon afterward. Hundreds of Slashdot readers then searched the Internet for advertising mailing lists and free catalogs and signed him up for them. As a result, he was flooded with junk mail. In a Detroit Free Press article on December 6, 2002, he is quoted as saying, "They've signed me up for every advertising campaign and mailing list there is. These people are out of their minds. They're harassing me."

== Legal timeline ==
- In 1992 he served a fifty-day sentence for selling unregistered securities.
- On August 7, 1995, he pleaded guilty to federal bank fraud in Ohio. He served three years probation for a felony charge of falsifying banking records.
- On March 14, 1999, he pleaded guilty to misprision of felony in Michigan.
- In early October, 2005, a warrant was unsealed, showing the Federal Bureau of Investigation (FBI) raided Alan Ralsky's home in September. In the raid, the FBI took computers, financial records, and even the Detroit News article cited above. They then raided his son-in-law's home. Ralsky's business was not legally shut down, but he was unable to operate following the raid.
- On January 3, 2008, Ralsky and ten others were indicted based on the results of a three-year investigation. The indictment included stock fraud charges stemming from a "pump and dump" scheme.
- On January 9, 2008, Ralsky was arraigned on the charges that he was indicted for on January 3, 2008. He was silent during the arraignment, so a plea of not guilty was entered on his behalf.
- On June 22, 2009, he pleaded guilty to wire fraud, mail fraud, money laundering charges and violating the CAN-SPAM Act. He agreed to assist in the prosecution of other spammers in exchange for sentencing consideration.
- On November 23, 2009, he was sentenced by U.S. District Judge Marianne Battani to four years, three months in jail. He was also fined $250,000.
- Alan Ralsky was inmate No. 19509-039 at the Federal Correctional Institution, Morgantown.
- He was released on 14 September 2012.

== See also ==
- List of spammers
- Peter Levashov, a partner of Ralsky according to The Spamhaus Project.
