= NiceHash =

Slovenian cryptocurrency company

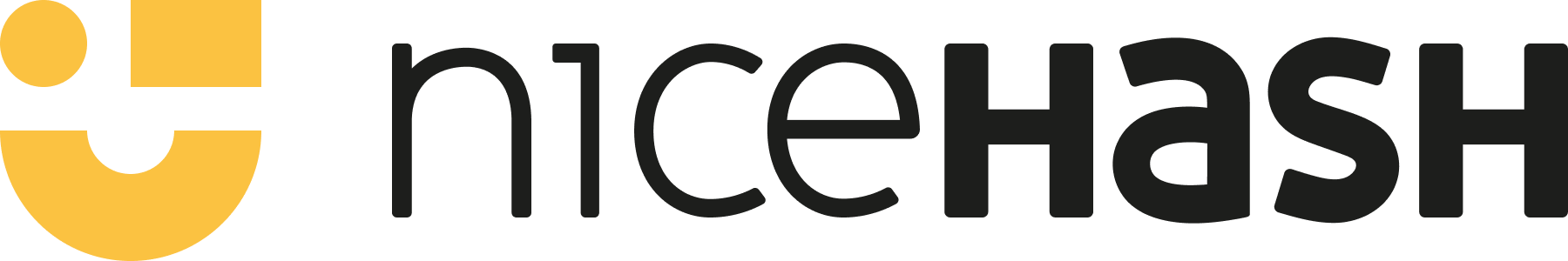
- Company type: Private
- Website type: Marketplace
- Headquarters: {{{location_country}}}
- Country of origin: Slovenia
- Area served: Worldwide (190+ Locations)
- Founders: Matjaž Škorjanc, Marko Kobal
- Industry: Cryptocurrency
- Services: Cryptocurrency, Software, Cryptocurrency Mining
- Employees: 60
- Parent: H-Bit Holding
- Website: www.nicehash.com
- Registration: Optional
- Users: 2.5 Million
- Launched: 2014; 12 years ago
- Current status: Online

NiceHash is a cryptocurrency broker and exchange with an open marketplace for buyers and sellers of hashing power. The company provides software for cryptocurrency mining. The company was founded in 2014 by two Slovenian university students, Marko Kobal and Matjaž Škorjanc. The company is based in The British Virgin Islands and has offices in Maribor, Slovenia.

== History ==
NiceHash was founded in 2014 by Matjaž Škorjanc, a former medical student turned computer programmer, and Marko Kobal. On December 6, 2017, approximately 4,700 Bitcoins (US$64 million at the time of the hack) were stolen from NiceHash allegedly by a spear phishing attack. On December 21, Kobal resigned as the CEO. On that day, the company also re-opened its marketplace after the attack. On February 17, 2021, the North Korean hacker group Lazarus was indicted for the hack.

Škorjanc was one of the creators of a malware called Mariposa botnet and served four years and ten months in a Slovenian prison. On June 5, 2019, US law enforcement reopened a case in the operations of the Mariposa (Butterfly Bot, BFBOT) malware gang. In 2019, the FBI moved forward with new charges and arrest warrants against four suspects, including Škorjanc. Matjaž was detained in Germany in 2019 for eight months. Germany and Slovenia rejected the American requests for extradition due to double jeopardy and he was released in 2020.

Škorjanc announced that the CEO in 2024 would be Vladimir Hozjan.
