= Spider.io =

British software company

Spider.io is a British software company that specializes in the detection of malware. It was founded in 2010 by Douglas de Jager, and is based in London, England. The company is known for its use of open-source software applications such as Hadoop and Mahout while handling large amounts of data. Spider.io is also known to have written its own proprietary software.

== Accomplishments ==
In 2012, Spider.io flagged a vulnerability in the search engine Internet Explorer, and claimed that it had been exploited at a large scale.

In 2013 the company reported its discovery and analysis of the Chameleon botnet on its blog.

Spider.io has also made an effort to raise awareness of the ease with which hackers can generate fake web traffic, and shared information on techniques which can be used to combat the problem.

== Acquisition by Google ==
In 2014 Spider.io was acquired by Google Inc. At that time, the company had seven employees. The acquisition was presumed to be a step taken by Google to combat false advertising on its platform, an activity with which Spider.io had some prior experience.
