= BotHunter =

Software for detecting botnet activity within a network

BotHunter is a free utility for Unix, which aims at detecting botnet activity within a network. It does so by analyzing network traffic and comparing it to patterns characteristic of malicious processes. Version 1.7.2 was current as of March 2013. An earlier version ran under Microsoft Windows XP, but was not mentioned on the Web site after the release of 1.7.2. In order to support this application, the developer, SRI International, had collected more than 10,000 samples of malware by 2008.

The BotHunter Web site states that the software was made possible in part by a research grant from the U.S. Army Research Office.
