= No-IP =

DNS and domain services provider

Vitalwerks Internet Solutions, LLC
- Type: Private
- Industry: DNS and Web Hosting
- Founded: 1999; 27 years ago (As Vitalwerks LLC)
- Headquarters: Reno, Nevada, US
- Products: Dynamic and managed DNS; Domain name registration; E-mail services; Server monitoring; SSL certificates; URL redirection
- ASN: 14627
- Website: www.noip.com

Vitalwerks Internet Solutions, LLC is a domain and host service provider. No-IP offers DNS services, DDNS, email, network monitoring and SSL certificates. Email services include POP3, SMTP, mail backup services, mail reflection and filtering.

== History ==
No-IP was launched in October 2000 offering free dynamic DNS and URL redirection. Users were able to create a sub-domain under a few domains owned by No-IP. In May 2000, Vitalwerks Internet Solutions, LLC was formed as the parent company of No-IP. In January 2001 No-IP began offering paid managed DNS services which allowed users to set up dynamic DNS using their own domain name. Later that year, they began to offer email services. They began reselling domain names in 2002 and in 2006 became an ICANN accredited registrar. No-IP was subsequently featured in MacUser in 2004 and PCMag in 2005.

== Technology and services ==
No-IP provides dynamic DNS services. A basic one is provided free to use as long as the user refreshes their access from time to time, thus keeping it active. Upgrades to the DDNS comes from purchases. Dynamic IP addresses are common on residential cable or DSL broadband accounts, and the typical users of DDNS would be the users of these types of internet connections. The service allows users to create a single free hostname on a No-IP domain. Software clients are provided for Windows, OS X, and Linux which allows the DDNS to connect with these OSes. More often, however, routers are used in such a DDNS configurations.

Most open-source firmware distributions, such as OpenWrt and DD-WRT, include DDNS in their downloadable packages, but OpenWrt requires an extra package for No-IP specifically.

== Microsoft legal action and controversy ==
On 19 June 2014, Microsoft launched an ex parte legal action against No-IP, requesting that Microsoft be given control of 22 of No-IP's domain names. This was granted without notifying No-IP on 26 June 2014, and Microsoft began redirecting domain traffic to their sinkhole. According to No-IP this affected malicious and non malicious users alike, despite Microsoft's erroneous statement of intent to the contrary. Legitimate users of the service were also diverted to the Microsoft sinkhole. Backlash to the confiscation however led to Microsoft returning the domains to No-IP.

== See also ==
- DNS hosting service (see Free DNS)
