= Ramnit =

Computer worm

Ramnit is a computer worm affecting Windows users. It was estimated that it infected 800 000 Windows PCs between September and December 2011. The Ramnit botnet was dismantled by Europol and Symantec in 2015. At its peak in 2015, Ramnit was estimated to have infected 3,200,000 PCs. Ramnit infects removable media such as USB drives and also hides itself within the master boot record. As soon as it infects a computer, it copies itself to all attached and removable drives. It also searches and infects files with the extensions .exe, .dll, .htm and .html.

Parts of Ramnit's infrastructure survived the 2015 takedown. New infections were detected about nine months later, in November and December 2015. By January 2017 Ramnit ranked fifth among the most active banking trojans in data from IBM X-Force.
