= Michael Gregg =

American computer scientist

Michael Gregg is an American computer security specialist, businessman, author and co-author , some of his books include; Build Your Own Network Security Lab and Inside Network Security Assessment. He has also served as an expert witness before a congressional committee on cyber security and identity theft.

== Career ==
Gregg holds two associate degrees, a bachelor's degree and a master's degree.

He has been quoted in newsprint and featured on various television and radio shows, including NPR, The New York Times, ABC, CBS, Fox TV and others discussing cybersecurity and ethical hacking.

He is the lead faculty member for Villanova University's online Cyber Security program.

He also holds several certifications, including MCSE, MCT, CTT, A+, N+, CNA, CCNA, CIW Security Analyst, and TICSA.

== Publications ==
Gregg has contributed to the following published works:

- CISSP Exam Cram Questions 2nd edition Que Publishing ISBN 978-0-7897-3807-3
- CISSP Exam Cram Que 2nd edition Publishing ISBN 978-0-7897-3806-6
- CISSP Exam Cram Que 1st edition Publishing ISBN 978-0-7897-3446-4
- Inside Network Security Assessment Sams Publishing ISBN 978-0-672-32809-1
- Certified Ethical Hacker Exam Prep Que Publishing ISBN 978-0-7897-3531-7
- Hack the Stack Syngress Publishing ISBN 978-1-59749-109-9
- Syngress Force 2006 Emerging Threat Analysis: From Mischief to Malicious ISBN 978-1-59749-056-6
- Security Administrator Street Smarts 2nd edition Sybex ISBN 978-0-470-40485-0
- Security + Study Guide Syngress ISBN 978-1-59749-153-2
- CHFI Study Guide Syngress ISBN 978-1-59749-197-6
- InfoSecurity 2008 Threat Analysis Syngress ISBN 978-1-59749-224-9
- CompTIA Security+ Certification Kit ISBN 978-0-470-40486-7
- CISA Exam Prep Que ISBN 978-0-7897-3573-7
- Build Your Own Security Lab Wiley ISBN 978-0-470-17986-4

Gregg has written articles for print and Internet publications such as:

- http://www.certmag.com/issues/dec02/feature_gregg.cfm
- http://gocertify.com/article/ceh.shtml
- http://searchnetworking.techtarget.com/generic/0,295582,sid7_gci1226646,00.html
- http://www.cramsession.com/articles/get-article.asp?aid=1084
