= Donbot botnet =

E-mail spamming botnet

Bonbot

Malware details
- Alias: Buzus and Bachsoy
- Type: Botnet

Donbot, also known by its aliases Buzus and Bachsoy, is a botnet mostly involved in sending pharmaceutical and stock-based e-mail spam.

The Donbot botnet is thought to consist of roughly 125,000 individual computers, which together send 800 million spam messages a day. This amount equals about 1.3% of the estimated total global spam volume of 230 billion messages a day, though the botnet has known spikes where it accounted for up to 4% of the total spam volume.

== See also ==
- Malware
- Internet crime
- Internet security
- Internet spam
