= EvoSwitch =

Dutch internet service provider

Coordinates: 52°23′29.84″N 4°39′53.29″E

EvoSwitch is part of the Ocom Group, based in Amsterdam and described as Europe's largest privately owned Internet service provider.

== Sites ==
=== Netherlands ===
The EvoSwitch data centre in the Waarderpolder (Haarlem) is known for hosting the Wikimedia Foundation's PoP that serves as web cache for traffic from Europe, as part of a €300,000 donation of in-kind support to the foundation.

=== Virginia ===
In 2012, the company announced the signing of a long-term lease to open its WDC1 data center in Manassas, Virginia, near Washington, D.C., where many other companies needing "colocation and interconnection services" are based. They expect this location to facilitate business with providers such as Verizon and Sidera Networks. They would compete to provide cloud computing and virtual services against companies including CenturyLink's Savvis, Terremark and Equinix.

The WDC1 data center was created by leasing three one-megawatt data halls from the COPT6 (PowerLoft) data center in Manassas. The PowerLoft site is located in the Innovation Technology Park of George Mason University, a 1600-acre campus whose other tenants include "the FBI Northern Virginia Resident Agency, American Type Culture Collection, Mediatech ... the GMU/NIH Biosafety Research Laboratory, the Virginia Department of Forensics Science, Comcast, [and] Zestron".

== Marketing strategies ==
The company plans a Power Usage Effectiveness rating of 1.3, which it hopes to use as a selling point. The Haarlem data centre is advertised as carbon neutral.

== Partners and competitors ==
In January 2014, the EvoSwitch data centre in Virginia began exchanging Internet traffic with LINX NoVA (part of London Internet Exchange).

It has an agreement with IX Reach.
