= Rock Phish =

Phishing toolkit and the group behind it

Rock Phish refers to both a phishing toolkit/technique and the group behind it.

== Rock Phish gang and techniques ==
At one time the Rock Phish group was stated to be behind "one-half of the phishing attacks being carried out. VeriSign reports them as a group of Romanian origin, but others have claimed that the group is Russian. They were first identified in 2004.

Their techniques were sophisticated and distinctive, as outlined in a presentation at APWG eCrime '07.

== History ==
In 2004 the first rock phishing attacks contained the folder path “/rock”, which led to the name of the attack, and group.

Attackers employed wild card DNS (domain name server) entries to create addresses that included the target's actual address as a sub-domain. For example, in the case of a site appearing as www.thebank.com.1.cn/thebank.html, ”thebank.com” portion of the domain name is the “wild card”, meaning its presence is purely superficial – it is not required in order for the phishing page to be displayed. “1.cn” is the registered domain name, “/thebank.html” is the phishing page, and the combination of “1.cn/thebank” will display the phishing page. This allows the perpetrators to make the wild card portion the legitimate domain name, so that it appears at first glance to be a valid folder path.
