= Network domain =

Grouping of computer networks or hosts

A network domain is an administrative grouping of multiple private computer networks or local hosts within the same infrastructure. Domains can be identified using a domain name; domains that need to be accessible from the public Internet can be assigned a globally unique name within the Domain Name System (DNS).

A domain controller is a server that automates the logins, user groups, and architecture of a domain, rather than manually coding this information on each host in the domain. It is common practice, but not required, to have the domain controller act as a DNS server. That is, it would assign names to hosts in the network based on their IP addresses.

== Usage ==
Use of the term network domain first appeared in 1965 and saw increasing usage beginning in 1985. It initially applied to the naming of radio stations based on broadcast frequency and geographic area. It entered its current usage by network theorists to describe solutions to the problems of subdividing a single homogeneous LAN and joining multiple networks, possibly constituted of different network architectures.
