= Botnet =

Collection of compromised internet-connected devices controlled by a third party

Stacheldraht botnet diagram showing a DDoS attack (Note this is also an example of a type of client–server model of a botnet.)

A botnet is a group of Internet-connected devices, each of which runs one or more bots. Botnets can be used to perform distributed denial-of-service (DDoS) attacks, steal data, send spam, and allow the attacker to access the device and its connection. The owner can control the botnet using command and control (C&C) software. The word "botnet" is a portmanteau of the words "robot" and "network". The term is usually used with a negative or malicious connotation.

== Overview ==
A botnet is a logical collection of Internet-connected devices, such as computers, smartphones or Internet of things (IoT) devices whose security has been breached and control ceded to a third party. Each compromised device, known as a "bot," is created when a device is penetrated by software from a malware (malicious software) distribution. The controller of a botnet can direct the activities of these compromised computers through communication channels formed by network protocols, such as Internet Relay Chat (IRC) and Hypertext Transfer Protocol (HTTP).

Operating, building, or using a botnet to access or control devices without their owners' authorization is illegal in most jurisdictions and is regularly prosecuted as hacking, fraud, or related cyber-crime. Law enforcement and private parties also use legal tools to disrupt botnets, but those takedowns raise separate legal and constitutional issues.

Botnets are increasingly rented out by cyber criminals as commodities for a variety of purposes, including as booter/stresser services.

== Architecture ==
Botnet architecture has evolved over time in an effort to evade detection and disruption. Traditionally, bot programs are constructed as clients which communicate via existing servers. This allows the bot herder (the controller of the botnet) to perform all control from a remote location, which obfuscates the traffic. Many recent botnets now rely on existing peer-to-peer networks to communicate. These P2P bot programs perform the same actions as the client–server model, but they do not require a central server to communicate.

=== Client–server model ===
A network based on the client–server model, where individual clients request services and resources from centralized servers

The first botnets on the Internet used a client–server model to accomplish their tasks. Typically, these botnets operate through Internet Relay Chat networks, domains, or websites. Infected clients access a predetermined location and await incoming commands from the server. The bot herder sends commands to the server, which relays them to the clients. Clients execute the commands and report their results back to the bot herder.

In the case of IRC botnets, infected clients connect to an infected IRC server and join a channel pre-designated for C&C by the bot herder. The bot herder sends commands to the channel via the IRC server. Each client retrieves the commands and executes them. Clients send messages back to the IRC channel with the results of their actions.

=== Peer-to-peer ===
A peer-to-peer (P2P) network in which interconnected nodes ("peers") share resources among each other without the use of a centralized administrative system

In response to efforts to detect and decapitate IRC botnets, bot herders have begun deploying malware on peer-to-peer networks. These bots may use digital signatures so that only someone with access to the private key can control the botnet, such as in Gameover ZeuS and the ZeroAccess botnet.

Newer botnets fully operate over P2P networks. Rather than communicate with a centralized server, P2P bots perform as both a command distribution server and a client that receives commands. This avoids having any single point of failure, which is an issue for centralized botnets.

In order to find other infected machines, P2P bots discreetly probe random IP addresses until they identify another infected machine. The contacted bot replies with information such as its software version and list of known bots. If one of the bots' version is lower than the other, they will initiate a file transfer to update. This way, each bot grows its list of infected machines and updates itself by periodically communicating to all known bots.

== Core components ==
A botnet's originator (known as a "bot herder" or "bot master") controls the botnet remotely. This is known as the command-and-control (C&C). The program for the operation must communicate via a covert channel to the client on the victim's machine (zombie computer).

=== Control protocols ===
IRC is a historically favored means of C&C because of its communication protocol. A bot herder creates an IRC channel for infected clients to join. Messages sent to the channel are broadcast to all channel members. The bot herder may set the channel's topic to command the botnet. For example, the message :herder!herder@example.com TOPIC #channel DDoS www.victim.com from the bot herder alerts all infected clients belonging to #channel to begin a DDoS attack on the website www.victim.com. An example response :bot1!bot1@compromised.net PRIVMSG #channel I am DDoSing www.victim.com by a bot client alerts the bot herder that it has begun the attack.

Some botnets implement custom versions of well-known protocols. The implementation differences can be used for detection of botnets. For example, Mega-D features a slightly modified Simple Mail Transfer Protocol (SMTP) implementation for testing spam capability. Bringing down the Mega-D's SMTP server disables the entire pool of bots that rely upon the same SMTP server.

=== Zombie computer ===
In computer science, a zombie computer is a computer connected to the Internet that has been compromised by a hacker, computer virus or trojan horse and can be used to perform malicious tasks under remote direction. Botnets of zombie computers are often used to spread e-mail spam and launch denial-of-service attacks (DDoS). Most owners of zombie computers are unaware that their system is being used in this way. Because the owner tends to be unaware, these computers are metaphorically compared to zombies. A coordinated DDoS attack by multiple botnet machines also resembles a zombie horde attack.

The process of stealing computing resources as a result of a system being joined to a "botnet" is sometimes referred to as "scrumping".

== Command and control ==
Botnet command and control (C&C) protocols have been implemented in a number of ways, from traditional IRC approaches to more sophisticated versions.

=== Telnet ===
Telnet botnets use a simple C&C botnet protocol in which bots connect to the main command server to host the botnet. Bots are added to the botnet by using a scanning script, which runs on an external server and scans IP ranges for telnet and SSH server default logins. Once a login is found, the scanning server can infect it through SSH with malware, which pings the control server.

=== IRC ===
IRC networks use simple, low-bandwidth communication methods, making them widely used to host botnets. They tend to be relatively simple in construction and have been used with moderate success for coordinating DDoS attacks and spam campaigns while being able to continually switch channels to avoid being taken down. However, in some cases, merely blocking certain keywords has proven effective in stopping IRC-based botnets. The RFC 1459 (IRC) standard is popular with botnets. The first known popular botnet controller script, "MaXiTE Bot" used the IRC XDCC protocol for private control commands.

One problem with using IRC is that each bot client must know the IRC server, port, and channel to be of any use to the botnet. Anti-malware organizations can detect and shut down these servers and channels, effectively halting the botnet attack. If this happens, clients are still infected, but they typically lie dormant since they have no way of receiving instructions. To mitigate this problem, a botnet can consist of several servers or channels. If one of the servers or channels becomes disabled, the botnet simply switches to another. It is still possible to detect and disrupt additional botnet servers or channels by sniffing IRC traffic. A botnet adversary can even potentially gain knowledge of the control scheme and imitate the bot herder by issuing commands correctly.

=== P2P ===
Since most botnets using IRC networks and domains can be taken down over time, hackers have moved to P2P botnets with C&C to make the botnet more resilient and resistant to termination.

Some have also used encryption as a way to secure or lock down the botnet from others; most of the time when they use encryption it is public-key cryptography and has presented challenges in both implementing it and breaking it.

=== Domains ===
Many large botnets tend to use domains rather than IRC in their construction (see Rustock botnet and Srizbi botnet). They are usually hosted with bulletproof hosting services. This is one of the earliest types of C&C. A zombie computer accesses a specially designed webpage or domain(s) which serves the list of controlling commands. The advantages of using web pages or domains as C&C is that a large botnet can be effectively controlled and maintained with very simple code that can be readily updated.

Disadvantages of using this method are that it uses a considerable amount of bandwidth at large scale, and domains can be quickly seized by government agencies with little effort. If the domains controlling the botnets are not seized, they are also easy targets to compromise with denial-of-service attacks.

Fast-flux DNS can be used to make it difficult to track down the control servers, which may change from day to day. Control servers may also hop from DNS domain to DNS domain, with domain generation algorithms being used to create new DNS names for controller servers.

Some botnets use free DNS hosting services such as DynDns.org, No-IP.com, and Afraid.org to point a subdomain towards an IRC server that harbors the bots. While these free DNS services do not themselves host attacks, they provide reference points (often hard-coded into the botnet executable). Removing such services can cripple an entire botnet.

=== Others ===
Calling back to popular sites such as GitHub, Twitter, Reddit, Instagram, the XMPP open source instant message protocol and Tor hidden services are popular ways of avoiding egress filtering to communicate with a C&C server.

== Construction ==
=== Traditional ===
This example illustrates how a botnet is created and used for malicious gain.

1. A hacker purchases or builds a Trojan and/or exploit kit and uses it to start infecting users' computers, whose payload is a malicious application—the bot.
2. The bot instructs the infected PC to connect to a particular command-and-control (C&C) server. (This allows the botmaster to keep logs of how many bots are active and online.)
3. The botmaster may then use the bots to gather keystrokes or use form grabbing to steal online credentials and may rent out the botnet as DDoS and/or spam as a service or sell the credentials online for a profit.
4. Depending on the quality and capability of the bots, the value is increased or decreased.

Newer bots can automatically scan their environment and propagate themselves using vulnerabilities and weak passwords. Generally, the more vulnerabilities a bot can scan and propagate through, the more valuable it becomes to a botnet controller community.

Computers can be co-opted into a botnet when they execute malicious software. This can be accomplished by luring users into making a drive-by download, exploiting web browser vulnerabilities, or by tricking the user into running a Trojan horse program, which may come from an email attachment. This malware will typically install modules that allow the computer to be commanded and controlled by the botnet's operator. After the software is downloaded, it will call home (send a reconnection packet) to the host computer. When the reconnection is made, depending on how it is written, a Trojan may then delete itself or may remain present to update and maintain the modules.

=== Others ===
In some cases, a botnet may be temporarily created by volunteer hacktivists, such as with implementations of the Low Orbit Ion Cannon as used by 4chan members during Project Chanology in 2010.

China's Great Cannon of China allows the modification of legitimate web browsing traffic at internet backbones into China to create a large ephemeral botnet to attack large targets such as GitHub in 2015.

== Common uses ==
- Distributed denial-of-service attacks are one of the most common uses for botnets, in which multiple systems submit as many requests as possible to a single Internet computer or service, overloading it and preventing it from servicing legitimate requests. An example is an attack on a victim's server. The victim's server is bombarded with requests by the bots, attempting to connect to the server, therefore overloading it. Google fraud czar Shuman Ghosemajumder has said that these types of attacks causing outages on major websites will continue to occur regularly due to the use of botnets as a service.
- Spyware is software which sends information to its creators about a user's activities – typically passwords, credit card numbers and other information that can be sold on the black market. Compromised machines that are located within a corporate network can be worth more to the bot herder, as they can often gain access to confidential corporate information. Several targeted attacks on large corporations aimed to steal sensitive information, such as the Aurora botnet.
- E-mail spam are e-mail messages disguised as messages from people, but are either advertising, annoying, or malicious. As of 2005, an estimated 50–80% of all spam worldwide was sent by zombie computers. This allows spammers to avoid detection and presumably reduces their bandwidth costs, since the owners of zombies pay for their own bandwidth.
- Click fraud occurs when the user's computer visits websites without the user's awareness to create false web traffic for personal or commercial gain.
- Ad fraud is often a consequence of malicious bot activity, according to CHEQ, Ad Fraud 2019, The Economic Cost of Bad Actors on the Internet. Commercial purposes of bots include influencers using them to boost their supposed popularity, and online publishers using bots to increase the number of clicks an ad receives, allowing sites to earn more commission from advertisers.
- Credential stuffing attacks use botnets to log in to many user accounts with stolen passwords, such as in the attack against General Motors in 2022.
- Bitcoin mining was used in some of the more recent botnets, which include bitcoin mining as a feature to generate profits for the operator of the botnet.
- Self-spreading functionality, to seek for pre-configured command-and-control (CNC) pushed instruction contains targeted devices or networks, to aim for more infection, is also spotted in several botnets. Some of the botnets are utilizing this function to automate their infections.

== Smartphones ==
Beginning in July 2009, similar botnet capabilities have also emerged for the growing smartphone market. Examples include the July 2009 in the "wild" release of the Sexy Space text message worm, the world's first botnet capable SMS worm, which targeted the Symbian operating system in Nokia smartphones. Later that month, researcher Charlie Miller revealed a proof of concept text message worm for the iPhone at Black Hat Briefings. Also in July, United Arab Emirates consumers were targeted by the Etisalat BlackBerry spyware program. In the 2010s, the security community is divided as to the real-world potential of mobile botnets. But in an August 2009 interview with The New York Times, cyber security consultant Michael Gregg summarized the issue this way: "We are about at the point with [smart]phones that we were with desktops in the '80s."

== Residential proxy ==
A residential proxy (RESIP) is an intermediary that uses a real IP address provided by an Internet service provider with physical devices such as mobile phones and end-user computers. Instead of connecting directly to a server, residential proxy users connect to the target through residential IP addresses. The target then identifies them as organic internet users. It does not let any tracking tool identify the reallocation of the user. Any residential proxy can send any number of concurrent requests, and IP addresses are directly related to a specific region. Unlike regular residential proxies, which hide the user's real IP address behind another IP address, rotating residential proxies, also known as backconnect proxies, conceal the user's real IP address behind a pool of proxies. These proxies switch between themselves at every session or at regular intervals.

Despite providers' assertions that the proxy hosts are voluntarily participating, numerous proxies are operated on potentially compromised hosts, including Internet of things devices. Through the process of cross-referencing the hosts, researchers have identified and analyzed logs that have been classified as potentially unwanted program and exposed a range of unauthorized activities conducted by RESIP hosts. These activities encompassed illegal promotion, fast fluxing, phishing, hosting malware, and more.

== Market ==
Botnet operators frequently compete to achieve the largest network size, the highest overall bandwidth, and the greatest number of compromised devices within institutional networks, such as universities, corporations, and government agencies.

While botnets are often named after the malware that created them, multiple botnets typically use the same malware but are operated by different entities.

== Phishing ==
Botnets can be used for many electronic scams. These botnets can be used to distribute malware such as viruses to take control of a regular user's computer/software. By taking control of someone's personal computer they have unlimited access to their personal information, including passwords and login information to accounts. This is called phishing. Phishing is the acquiring of login information to the "victim's" accounts with a link the "victim" clicks on that is sent through an email or text. A survey by Verizon found that around two-thirds of electronic "espionage" cases come from phishing.

== Countermeasures ==
The geographic dispersal of botnets means that each recruit must be individually identified/corralled/repaired and limits the benefits of filtering.

Computer security experts have succeeded in destroying or subverting malware command and control networks by, among other means, seizing servers or getting them cut off from the Internet, denying access to domains that were due to be used by malware to contact its C&C infrastructure, and, in some cases, breaking into the C&C network itself. In response to this, C&C operators have resorted to using techniques such as overlaying their C&C networks on other existing benign infrastructure such as IRC or Tor, using peer-to-peer networking systems that are not dependent on any fixed servers, and using public key encryption to defeat attempts to break into or spoof the network.

Norton AntiBot was aimed at consumers, but most target enterprises and/or ISPs. Host-based techniques use heuristics to identify bot behavior that has bypassed conventional anti-virus software. Network-based approaches tend to use the techniques described above; shutting down C&C servers, null-routing DNS entries, or completely shutting down IRC servers. BotHunter is software, developed with support from the U.S. Army Research Office, that detects botnet activity within a network by analyzing network traffic and comparing it to patterns characteristic of malicious processes.

Researchers at Sandia National Laboratories are analyzing botnets' behavior by simultaneously running one million Linux kernels—a similar scale to a botnet—as virtual machines on a 4,480-node high-performance computer cluster to emulate a very large network, allowing them to watch how botnets work and experiment with ways to stop them.

Detecting automated bot becomes more difficult as newer and more sophisticated generations of bots get launched by attackers. For example, an automated attack can deploy a large bot army and apply brute-force methods with highly accurate username and password lists to hack into accounts. The idea is to overwhelm sites with tens of thousands of requests from different IPs all over the world, but with each bot only submitting a single request every 10 minutes or so, which can result in more than 5 million attempts per day. In these cases, many tools try to leverage volumetric detection, but automated bot attacks now have ways of circumventing triggers of volumetric detection.

One of the techniques for detecting these bot attacks is what's known as "signature-based systems" in which the software will attempt to detect patterns in the request packet. However, attacks are constantly evolving, so this may not be a viable option when patterns cannot be discerned from thousands of requests. There is also the behavioral approach to thwarting bots, which ultimately tries to distinguish bots from humans. By identifying non-human behavior and recognizing known bot behavior, this process can be applied at the user, browser, and network levels.

The most capable method of using software to combat a virus has been to utilize honeypot software in order to convince the malware that a system is vulnerable. The malicious files are then analyzed using forensic software.

On 15 July 2014, the Subcommittee on Crime and Terrorism of the Committee on the Judiciary, United States Senate, held a hearing on the threats posed by botnets and the public and private efforts to disrupt and dismantle them.

In May 2024, Europol announced that an international law enforcement action named Operation Endgame had disrupted several botnets and malware droppers used in ransomware attacks, including IcedID, SystemBC, Pikabot, Smokeloader, Bumblebee and Trickbot. The takedowns, led by France, Germany and the Netherlands, took place from 27 to 29 May and resulted in four arrests, the seizure of more than 100 servers and the takeover of 2,000 domains. In a later phase, from 19 to 22 May 2025, authorities took down 300 servers and 650 domains, issued 20 international arrest warrants and seized €3.5 million in cryptocurrency; the targeted malware included Qakbot, DanaBot, Bumblebee, Trickbot and Warmcookie. A further phase from 10 to 13 November 2025, coordinated by Europol and Eurojust, dismantled the Rhadamanthys Stealer, Venom RAT and the Elysium botnet; it took down more than 1,025 servers, seized 20 domains and led to one arrest in Greece.

The rise in vulnerable IoT devices has led to an increase in IoT-based botnet attacks. To address this, a novel network-based anomaly detection method for IoT called N-BaIoT was introduced. It captures network behavior snapshots and employs deep autoencoders to identify abnormal traffic from compromised IoT devices. The method was tested by infecting nine IoT devices with Mirai and BASHLITE botnets, showing its ability to accurately and promptly detect attacks originating from compromised IoT devices within a botnet.

== Historical list of botnets ==
The first botnet was first acknowledged and exposed by EarthLink during a lawsuit with notorious spammer Khan C. Smith in 2001. The botnet was constructed for the purpose of bulk spam, and accounted for nearly 25% of all spam at the time.

Around 2006, to thwart detection, some botnets were scaling back in size.

The following is a non-exhaustive list of some historical botnets.

Date created	Date dismantled	Name	Estimated no. of bots	Spam capacity (bn/day)	Aliases
2002		MaXiTE	500-1000 servers	0	MaXiTE XDCC Bot, MaXiTE IRC TCL Script, MaxServ
Unknown (no later than 2004)		Marina Botnet	6,215,000	92	
		Torpig	180,000		Sinowal, Anserin
		Storm	160,000	3	Nuwar, Peacomm, Zhelatin
2006 (around)	2011 (March)	Rustock	150,000	30	RKRustok, Costrat
		Donbot	125,000	0.8	Buzus, Bachsoy
2007 (around)		Cutwail	1,500,000	74	Pandex, Mutant (related to: Wigon, Pushdo)
2007		Akbot	1,300,000		
2007 (March)	2008 (November)	Srizbi	450,000	60	Cbeplay, Exchanger
2008 (around)		Sality	1,000,000		Sector, Kuku
2008 (around)	2009-Dec	Mariposa	12,000,000		
2008 (around)		Kraken	495,000	9	Kracken
2008 (November)		Conficker	10,500,000+	10	DownUp, DownAndUp, DownAdUp, Kido
2008 (November)	2010 (March)	Waledac	80,000	1.5	Waled, Waledpak
		Onewordsub	40,000	1.8	
		Nucrypt	20,000	5	Loosky, Locksky
		Wopla	20,000	0.6	Pokier, Slogger, Cryptic
2008 (around)		Asprox	15,000		Danmec, Hydraflux
		Spamthru	12,000	0.35	Spam-DComServ, Covesmer, Xmiler
2008 (around)		Gumblar			
2009 (May)	November 2010 (not complete)	BredoLab	30,000,000	3.6	Oficla
2009 (Around)	2012-07-19	Grum	560,000	39.9	Tedroo
		Mega-D	509,000	10	Ozdok
2009 (August)		Festi	250,000	2.25	Spamnost
2010 (March)		Vulcanbot			
2010 (around)		TDL4	4,500,000		TDSS, Alureon
		Zeus	3,600,000 (US only)		Zbot, PRG, Wsnpoem, Gorhax, Kneber
2010	(Several: 2011, 2012)	Kelihos	300,000+	4	Hlux
2011 or earlier	2015 (February)	Ramnit	3,000,000		
2012 (Around)		Chameleon	120,000		None
2014		Necurs	6,000,000		
2016 (August)		Mirai	380,000		None
2022		Mantis	5000		
	August 2025	Rapper Bot	20,000+		
(unknown; active 2025)		Aisuru	"hundreds of thousands"		

- Researchers at the University of California, Santa Barbara took control of a botnet that was six times smaller than expected. In some countries, it is common for users to change their IP address a few times in one day. Estimating the size of the botnet by the number of IP addresses is often used by researchers, possibly leading to inaccurate assessments.

== See also ==
- Computer security
- Computer worm
- Spambot
- Timeline of computer viruses and worms
- Advanced Persistent Threat
- Volunteer computing
