= Jigsaw =

Jigsaw may refer to:

- Jigsaw (tool), a reciprocating saw that can cut irregular curves
- Jigsaw puzzle, a tiling puzzle that requires the assembly of interlocking pieces

== Arts and entertainment ==
=== Fictional characters ===
- Jigsaw (Saw character), in the horror franchise
- Jigsaw (Marvel Comics), an enemy of the Punisher and Spider-Man
- Jigsaw (Harvey Comics), the disconnectable "Man of a Thousand Parts"

=== Film and television ===
- Jigsaw (1949 film), a film noir
- Jigsaw (1962 film), a British crime drama
- Jigsaw (1968 film), an American mystery
- Jigsaw (1979 film), a Canadian-French drama
- Jigsaw (1989 film), a thriller
- Jigsaw (2017 film), a horror film in the Saw series
- Jigsaw (American TV series), a crime drama 1972–73
- Jigsaw (British TV series), a BBC children's programme 1979–84
- Jigsaw (Australian game show), 1965

=== Music ===
- Jigsaw (Australian band), a country pop band
- Jigsaw (British band), a pop rock band
- Jigsaw (Lady Sovereign album), 2009
- Jigsaw (The Shadows album), 1967
- Jigsaw (Mike Stern album), 1989
- "Jigsaw", a song by Marillion from the 1984 album Fugazi
- "Jigsaw", a song by Renaissance from the 1981 album Camera Camera
- "Jigsaw", a song by Conan Gray from the 2022 album Superache

=== Other uses in arts and entertainment ===
- Jigsaw (video game), 1995
- Jigsaw (novel), a 1989 semi-autobiographical novel by Sybille Bedford

== Businesses ==
- Jigsaw (company), formerly Google Ideas, a technology incubator
- Jigsaw (clothing retailer), a women's clothing retailer
- Jigsaw, a cloud-based data service provider acquired by Salesforce

== Computing ==
- Jigsaw (dating app)
- Jigsaw (ransomware), an encrypting ransomware
- Jigsaw project, of Java Platform Module System

== Other uses ==
- Jigsaw (teaching technique), a method of organizing classroom activity
- Jigsaw (wrestler), ring name of Edward McGuckin (born 1983)
- Jigsaw Islands, in Antarctica
- Jigsaw SitThailand, ring name of Nattapong Pongpan (born 2004)
- Jigsaw, common name of the moth Dysgonia torrida

== See also ==
- Jig (disambiguation)
- Saw (disambiguation)
- Jigsaw Puzzle (disambiguation)
- Jigdo, a software tool
