= Borland (surname) =

Borland is a surname of Scottish origin. The Borland ancestors came to Scotland with the Normans in the 11th Century.

Notable people with the surname include:

- Adrian Borland (1957–1999), English singer
- Albert Borland (1901–1961), South African cricketer
- Billy Borland (1888–1915), Scottish footballer
- Brian Borland, American football coach
- Bruce Borland (1958–1999), American golf course designer
- Carroll Borland (1914–1994), American professor
- Charles Borland (contemporary), American actor
- Charles Borland Jr. (1786–1852), American politician
- Chris Borland (born 1990), American football player
- Christine Borland (1965–2026), Scottish artist
- Frank Borland (1925–2013), Canadian soldier
- Hal Borland (1900–1978), American journalist and author
- James A. Borland (born 1944), American evangelical professor
- Jeff Borland, Australian economist
- Jimmy Borland (1910–1970), English professional ice hockey player
- John Borland (born 1977), English footballer
- John Borland (Scottish footballer) (born 1951), Scottish footballer
- Johnny Borland (1925–1990), New Zealand high jumper and athletics administrator
- John Borland Thayer III (1894–1945), American businessman and Titanic survivor
- Kevin Borland (1926–2000), Australian architect
- Kyle Borland (born 1961), American football player
- L.J. Borland (1992), American Author
- Polly Borland (born 1959), Australian photographer
- Scott Borland (contemporary, born 1979), American musician
- Solon Borland (1808–1864), American newspaperman and politician
- Toby Borland (born 1969), American professional baseball player
- Tom Borland (1933–2013), American professional baseball player
- Tuf Borland (born 1998), American football player
- W. S. Borland (1878–1959), American football and baseball coach
- Wes Borland (born 1975), American musician and rock guitarist
- William Borland (darts player) (born 1996), Scottish darts player
- William Borland (loyalist) (1969–2016), Northern Irish former footballer
- William Patterson Borland (1867–1919), American politician
- Willie Borland (born 1952), Scottish footballer

== Characters ==
- Al Borland, character on the American television series Home Improvement

== See also ==
- Borland (disambiguation)
- Borlant
