= Jiggs =

Jiggs may refer to:

== Animals ==
- Jiggs (chimpanzee), who originated the role of Cheeta in the Tarzan movies
- Jiggs (orangutan), held in the Universal City Zoo and San Diego Zoo in the early 20th century
- Jiggs II, the second of a number of English Bulldogs to serve as mascots of the United States Marine Corps

== Communities ==
- Jiggs, Nevada, an unincorporated community in Elko County

== People ==
=== Nickname ===
==== Military figures ====
- Frank Borland (1925–2013), Canadian Second World War soldier, recipient of the French Legion of Honor
- C. H. Jaeger (1913–1970), British Army lieutenant colonel and military band leader

==== Sportspeople ====
- George "Jiggs" Dahlberg, head coach of the 1945 Montana Grizzlies football team
- Edward Donahue (c. 1891–1961), American multi-sport college athlete, coach and administrator
- Jiggs Donahue (1879–1913), American professional baseball player
- John Donahue (baseball) (1894–1949), American professional baseball player
- Jiggs McDonald (born 1938), Canadian hockey sportscaster
- Jiggs Parrott (1871–1898), American professional baseball player
- Jiggs Parson (1885–1967), American professional baseball pitcher
- Jiggs Peters, race car driver in the 1954 AAA Championship Car season, among others
- Don Peterson (American football) (1928–2010), American college football player

==== Other ====
- Jiggs Kalra (1947–2019), Indian restaurateur, food columnist, television host, and author
- Jiggs Whigham (born 1943), American jazz trombonist

=== Fictional characters ===
- Jiggs, star of American comic strip Bringing Up Father, with his wife Maggie, from 1913 to 2000
  - Jiggs and Maggie (film series), a series of films with those characters, from 1946 to 1950
- Jiggs, a major character in the 1935 novel Pylon by William Faulkner
- Colonel Martin "Jiggs" Casey, in the 1964 film Seven Days in May, played by Kirk Douglas
- Jillian Jiggs, in children's books by Phoebe Gilman
- Master Sergeant Jiggs, Chief of Security for Project Tic-Toc in the Irwin Allen Television Series The Time Tunnel, portrayed by Wesley Lau

== Other ==
- Jiggs dinner, a traditional meal commonly prepared and eaten on Sundays in Newfoundland

== See also ==
- Jig (disambiguation)
