= Borland (disambiguation) =

Borland is an American software company.

Borland may also refer to:

- Borland (surname), a Scottish surname
- Borland Racing Developments, Australian racecar constructor
- Borland Amendment, US law

== Places ==
- Borland, Pleasants County, West Virginia, unincorporated community
- Mount Borland, mountain in Antarctica
- Lands of Borland, estate in Scotland

== See also ==
- Borland C (disambiguation)
