= Bones Gate =

Fraternity at Dartmouth College

- BG
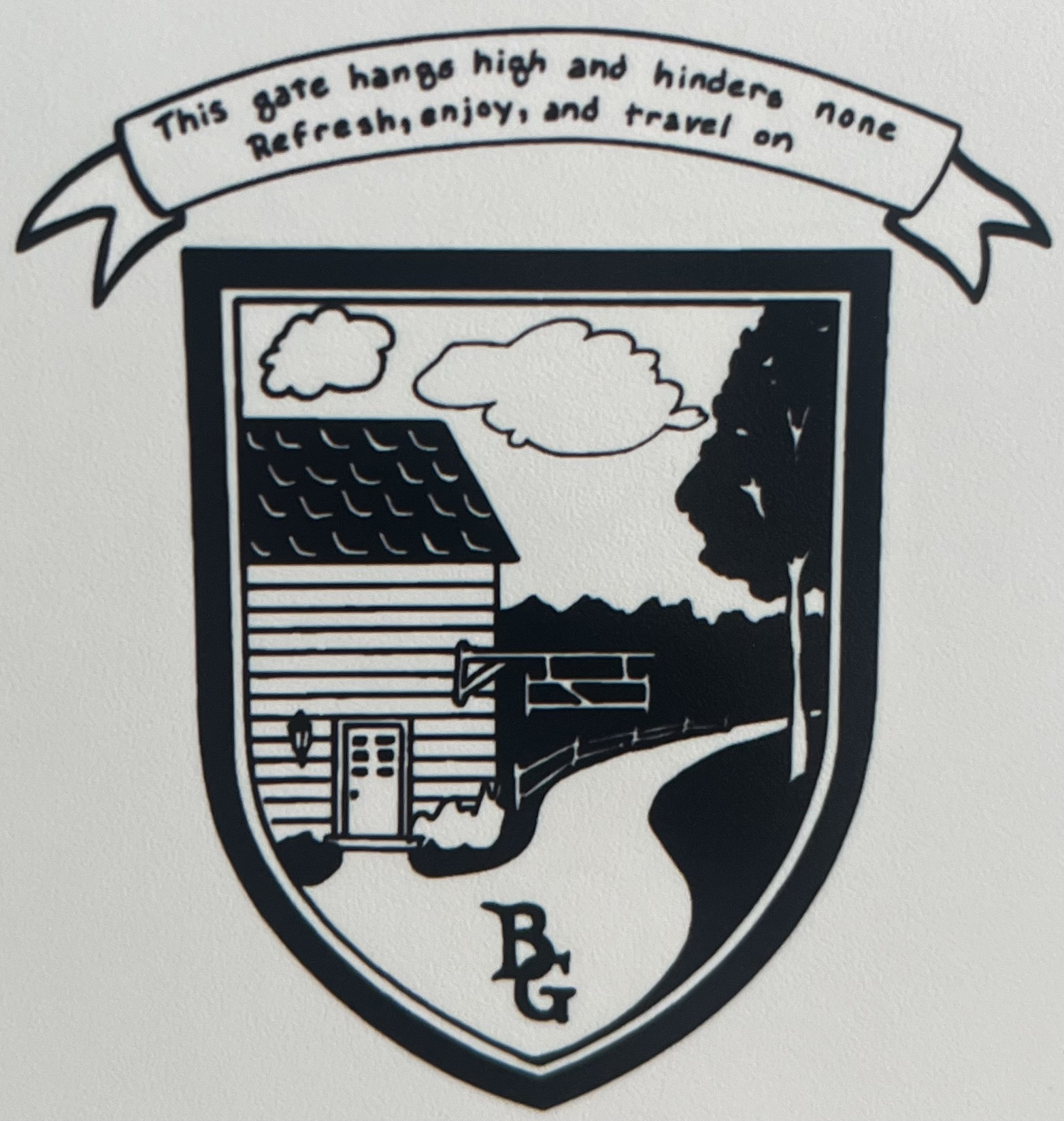
- Founded: 1962; 64 years ago Dartmouth College
- Type: Social
- Affiliation: None
- Former affiliation: Delta Tau Delta
- Status: Active
- Scope: Local
- Motto: "This gate hangs high and hinders none. Refresh, enjoy, and travel on."
- Colors: Black and White
- Symbol: Gate
- Chapters: 1
- Members: 75 active
- Headquarters: 10 Webster Avenue; Hanover, New Hampshire 03755; United States; 43.70618°N 72.29186°W
- Website: bonesgate.org

Bones Gate ("BG") is a local fraternal organization at Dartmouth College, an Ivy League university in Hanover, New Hampshire, United States. Originally founded in 1901 as the Gamma Gamma chapter of Delta Tau Delta, the fraternity disassociated from the national organization in 1960 and went unnamed until 1962 when it became Bones Gate—the name of a pub frequented by some of its members while studying abroad in England.

== History ==
The fraternity that would eventually become Bones Gate began in 1901 as the Hanover, New Hampshire chapter of Delta Tau Delta (ΔΤΔ). Bones Gate became a local fraternity in its own right in 1960 following a dispute between Dartmouth's ΔΤΔ chapter and the national organization over the latter's ban on non-white members. The fraternity's new name was chosen in 1962 in honor of a pub called The Bonesgate that several of its members frequented while studying abroad in Chessington, England. While this pub is still standing, it has since been renamed to The William Bourne.

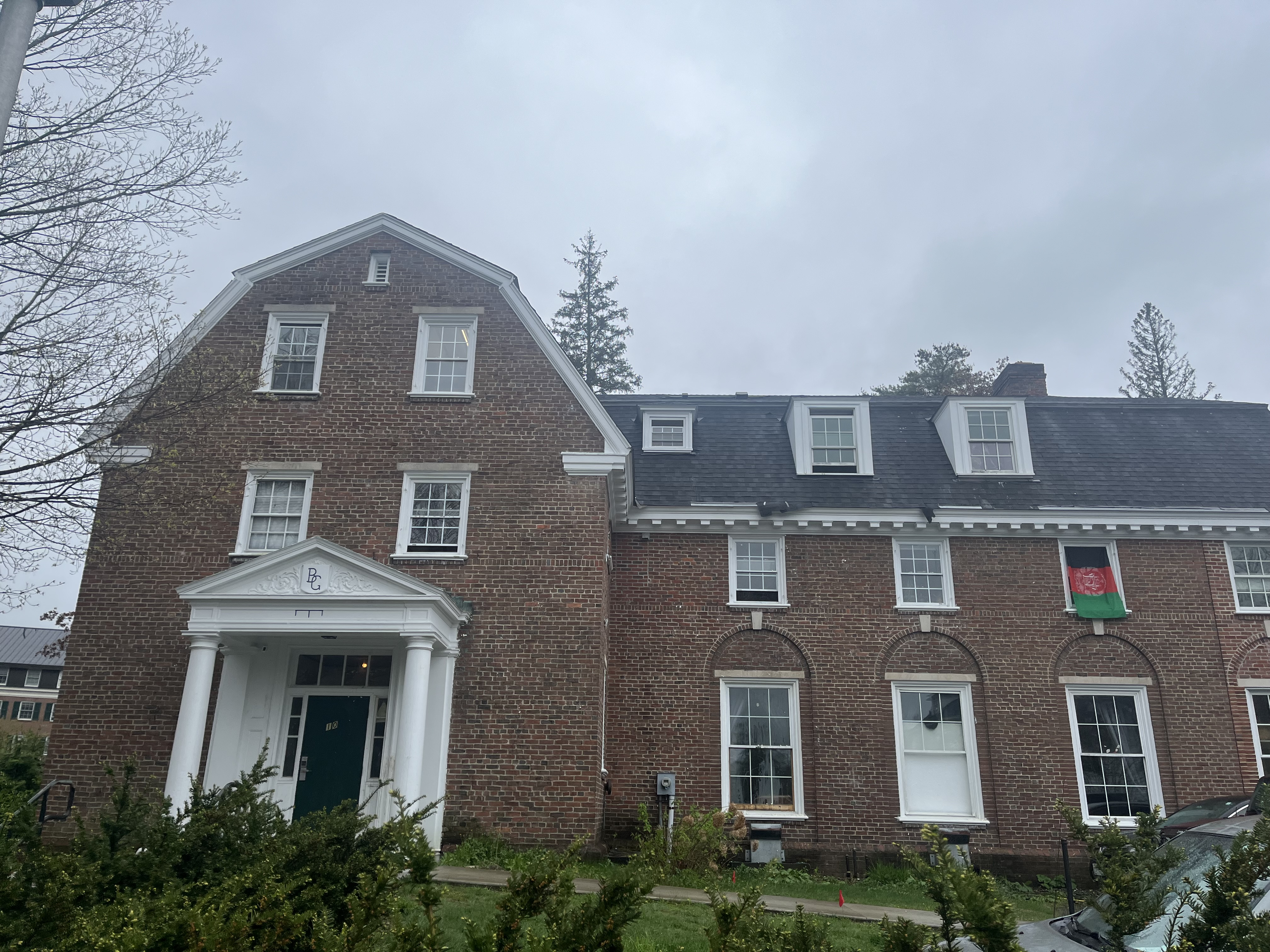
10 Webster Ave, the house occupied by Bones Gate, as it appeared in May 2024.

Following its transformation into a local fraternity with a new name, a unique house culture has developed over the decades. During the 1970s, it was known for its "fog cutters" parties which included unique costumes and fog cutter drinks, a combination of bourbon, gin, rum, and vodka. Traditionally, it held three fog cutters parties each year.

On November 9, 1983, one of the fraternity's "fog cutters" parties led to several people being taken to the hospital. After a police investigation, the fraternity and some of its members received two alcohol-related grand jury indictments consisting of nine felony charges in January 1984. These were the most serious charges ever brought against a Dartmouth fraternity. Fraternity members pled guilty to one of the charges, although their attorney and fraternity brother noted, "If somebody goes to a party and decides to drink themselves into oblivion, that's their problem." In a plea bargain, the fraternity was fined $25,000 ($70,420 in 2022 money) for serving alcohol to minors, with all but $5,000 suspended subject to good behavior for three years. The university placed the fraternity on social probation for one year.

In May 1988, Bones Gate held an Alice in Wonderland-themed Tea Party that led to three students being treated at the campus infirmary for overconsumption of alcohol; two of the students were underaged. The college suspended its recognition of Bones Gate for one year; this punishment included no alcohol in the fraternity's house. In September 1988, beer cans were found in the fraternity's house and the university permanently revoke its recognition of Bones House. This is the university's harshest punishment for fraternities and sororities and included a loss of college insurance, maintenance services, and protection from direct dealings with the local police. The fraternity negotiated re-recognition in April 1989 after agreeing to address its members alcohol abuse and to implement several reforms such as removing its beer taps and hiring a counselor to lead annual retreats.

In addition to its annual mud pit during Dartmouth's Green Key Weekend, BG is known on campus for its frequent hosting of bands and DJs, as well as its unorthodox pong rules. Campus involvement among its members varies widely; Bones Gate brothers are known to have leadership positions in several student organizations, ranging from club sports to cultural societies. It has 75 members.

== Symbols ==
The fraternity's colors are black and white. Its symbol is a gate. Its motto is "This gate hangs high and hinders none. Refresh, enjoy, and travel on." Bones Gate's motto is visible in the fraternity's crest.

== Philanthropy ==
Bones Gate supports sustainability and its community. Its members participate in Dartmouth Feeding Neighbors, a student effort to reduce campus food waste.

== Chapter house ==
The chapter moved to 10 Webster Avenue following the house's completion in 1925; except for a fire in 1929, this has continuously served as the fraternity's home. In the summer of 2005, the Bones Gate residence underwent significant structural renovations to bring the building up to the college's minimum standards. Improvements included an enclosed fire escape running from the basement to the third floor, a new bathroom on the ground floor, and the rehabilitation of all other bathrooms.

== Governance ==
Bones Gate is divided into several operational organizations, including its undergraduate chapter, the Alumni Corporation, the nonprofit Bones Gate Academic Foundation, and No. 10 Webster Avenue Corporation which is the owner of the fraternity's chapter house.

== Notable members ==
- Mahlon Apgar IV, government and business consultant
- Joseph Campbell, mythologist, writer, and lecturer known for The Hero with a Thousand Faces
- John Replogle, founding partner of One Better Ventures and the former CEO of Seventh Generation Inc.

== See also ==
- Dartmouth College fraternities and sororities
- Dartmouth College undergraduate societies
- Dartmouth College senior societies
- List of social fraternities
