= Jeffrey Hollender =

American entrepreneur, author and environmental activist

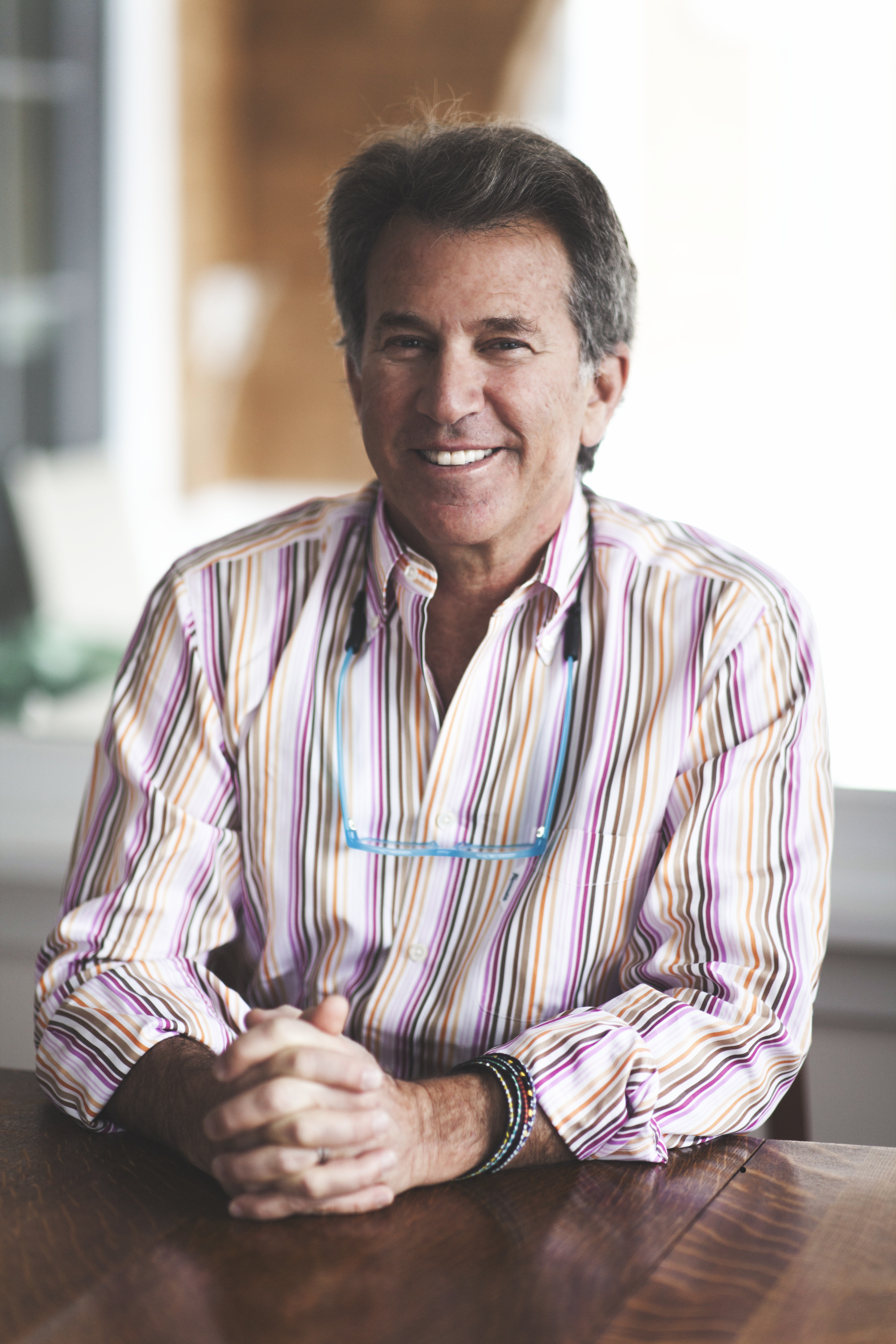
- Jeffrey Hollender in 2014
- Born: November 8, 1954 (age 71); New York City, New York, U.S.
- Education: Hampshire College
- Occupations: Business executive Author; Activist
- Known for: Founding Seventh Generation Inc.
- Board member of: Greenpeace, Kimberly-Clark
- Website: jeffreyhollender.com

Jeffrey Hollender (born 1954) is an American entrepreneur, author, and environmental activist who co-founded Seventh Generation Inc.

== Early life and education ==
Hollender was born in 1954 in New York City into an affluent family. His father, Alfred, was a businessman and advertising executive, and his mother, Lucille, was a former actress from a wealthy Chicago suburb.

At the age of 17, Hollender left home for Santa Barbara, California, and attended the Santa Barbara High School, briefly living in his car and protesting the Vietnam War. Earlier, in New York and Vermont he attended three other high schools, the Putney School, Riverdale Country Day School, and The Baldwin School. Later, he attended Hampshire College for a year and a half, until 1974. However, he left college after a year to move to London, where he explored psychoanalysis under the Philadelphia Association.

== Career ==
In 1976, Hollender established the Skills Exchange in Toronto, a nonprofit adult education venture. Later he moved back to New York, where he founded the Network for Learning, which he eventually sold in 1985. After selling the Network for Learning to Warner Publishing, a division of Warner Communications (now known as Time Warner), in 1985, Hollender was named president of the company, which was then renamed Warner Audio Publishing. Later, Hollender shifted his focus towards environmental and social activism.

In 1987, Hollender partnered with Alan Newman to purchase a mail order catalog business that focused on selling environmentally friendly products. A year later, this business became part of Seventh Generation Inc. which he also co-founded with Alan Newman, focusing on producing environmentally friendly products. Despite initial challenges and a split with Newman, Hollender's involvement in the environmental movements of the time helped establish his reputation. His commitment to the cause deepened following the suicide of his brother Peter in 2000, who had played a major role in the company.

In 2009, Hollender co-founded the American Sustainable Business Council. He also co-founded and was a director of Community Capital Bank, a New York-based financial institution focusing on investments in affordable housing and community development. Later, in the same year, Hollender stepped down as CEO of Seventh Generation and was succeeded by Chuck Maniscalco, a former PepsiCo executive. Maniscalco aimed to substantially increase company revenues but resigned after just over a year due to disagreements over the pace of expansion. In September 2010, Hollender was placed on leave and later split from the company under disputed circumstances. In 2016, after Unilever acquired Seventh Generation for $600 million, Hollender was asked to rejoin the company's board of directors, an opportunity he gratefully accepted.

In 2013, Jeffrey Hollender, his daughter Meika, and wife Sheila Hollender co-founded Sustain Natural, a company that focused on producing sustainable, fair trade, and non-toxic condoms in the sexual wellness industry. Sustain Natural was acquired by Grove Collaborative in 2019 for an undisclosed sum.

Hollender has continued to advocate for corporate responsibility, social equity, and addressing climate and population issues. He currently teaches in the Business & Society program at New York University's Stern Business School, where his courses focus on guiding students in creating socially responsible businesses. He is also "An Executive in Residence", at Stern where he mentors and coaches business school students. He also serves on the board of Vermont Businesses for Social Responsibility. Previously, Hollender served as the president of the Rainforest Foundation US as well as the Board Chair at Greenpeace US.

== Bibliography ==
Hollender has written six books on corporate responsibility and sustainable practices. Hollender's writing has been published in academic journals such as the Stanford Social Innovation Review.

- Hollender, Jeffrey; Catling, Linda (1985). How to Make the World a Better Place
- Hollender, Jeffrey; Davis, Geoff; Hollender, Meika (2006). Naturally Clean
- Hollender, Jeffrey (2006). In Our Every Deliberation: An Introduction to Seventh Generation
- Hollender, Jeffrey (2006). What Matters Most
- Hollender, Jeffrey; Breen, Bill (2010). The Responsibility Revolution: How the Next Generation of Businesses Will Win
- Hollender, Jeffrey; Zissu, Alexandra (2010). Planet Home

== Awards and recognition ==
- 2004: Terry Ehrich Award
- 2012: NYU Stern's Citi Leadership & Ethics Program Distinguished Fellow
- Fast Company Fast 50
- Winning Workplaces' Best Bosses Award 2006 (sponsored by FORTUNE)
