= Archiveus =

2006 computer virus

Archiveus is a computer virus for Microsoft Windows operating systems that is used as a method of extortion.

It is a Trojan horse-type ransomware virus that encrypts the user's files. The user must then purchase something on specific Web sites to obtain the password to decrypt the files. The virus primarily encrypts files located in the "My Documents" directory and requires victims to obtain a 30-digit password to regain access to their data.

In May 2006, the password protection was cracked. The password for restoring the affected files was found to be "mf2lro8sw03ufvnsq034jfowr18f3cszc20vmw". While Archiveus is no longer a prevalent threat, it played a significant role in the evolution of ransomware.

== See also ==
- Krotten
- PGPCoder
