= Band of the Irish Guards =

One of five bands in the UK Foot Guards Regiments

Irish Guards Band
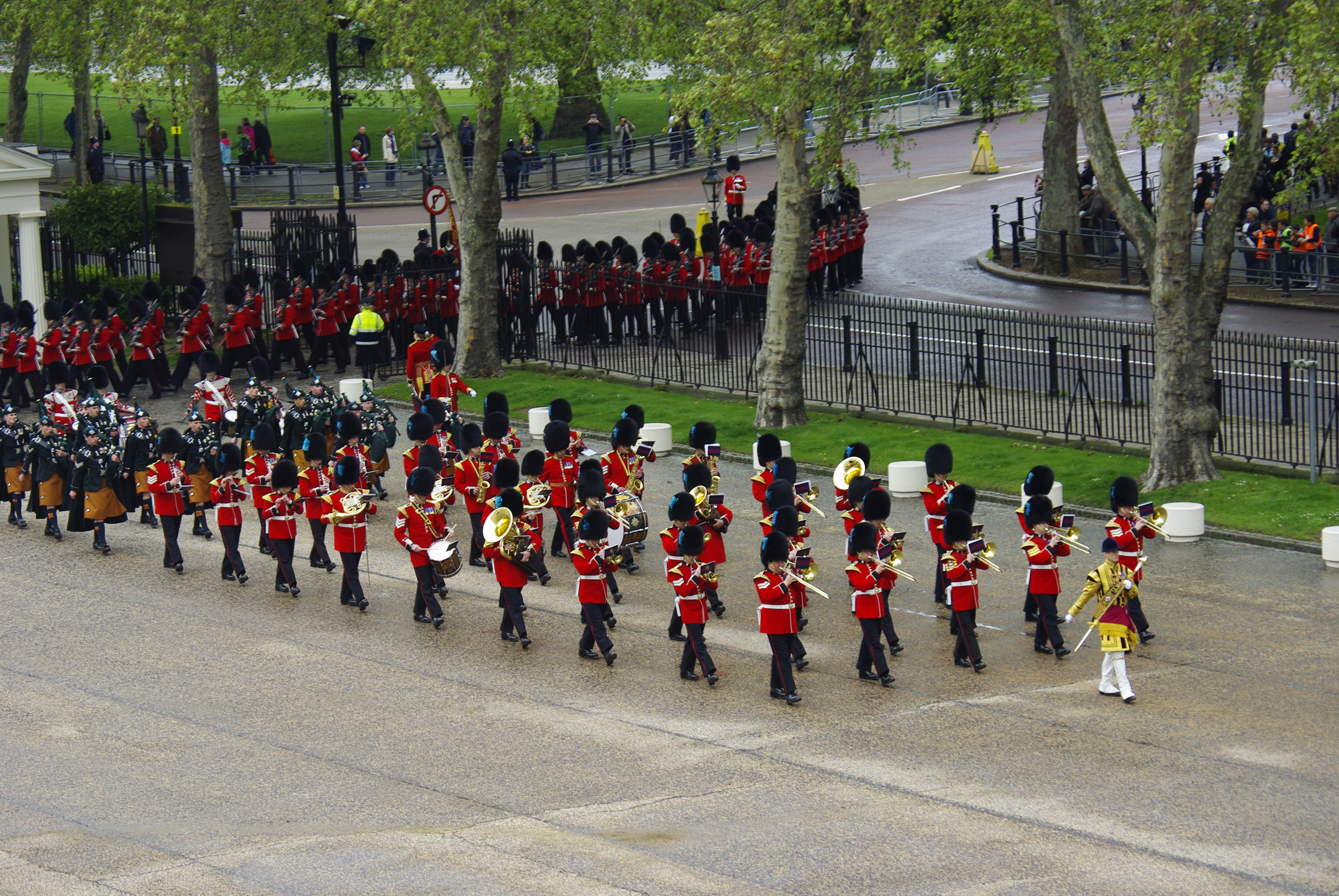
- Band of the Irish Guards at the State Opening of Parliament in 2012

Background information
- Also known as: Band of HM Irish Guards
- Website: Band of the Irish Guards - British Army

Irish Guards – Full Dress Drummers

The Band of the Irish Guards is one of five bands in the Foot Guards Regiments in the Household Division whose main role is to guard the British monarch. The Band supports the Regiment by providing the musical backing to which much of the ceremonial duties depend within Central London.

Unlike the 1st Battalion, Irish Guards, which moves to various duty stations around the world, the Band is based permanently at Wellington Barracks in St James's, London.

== History ==
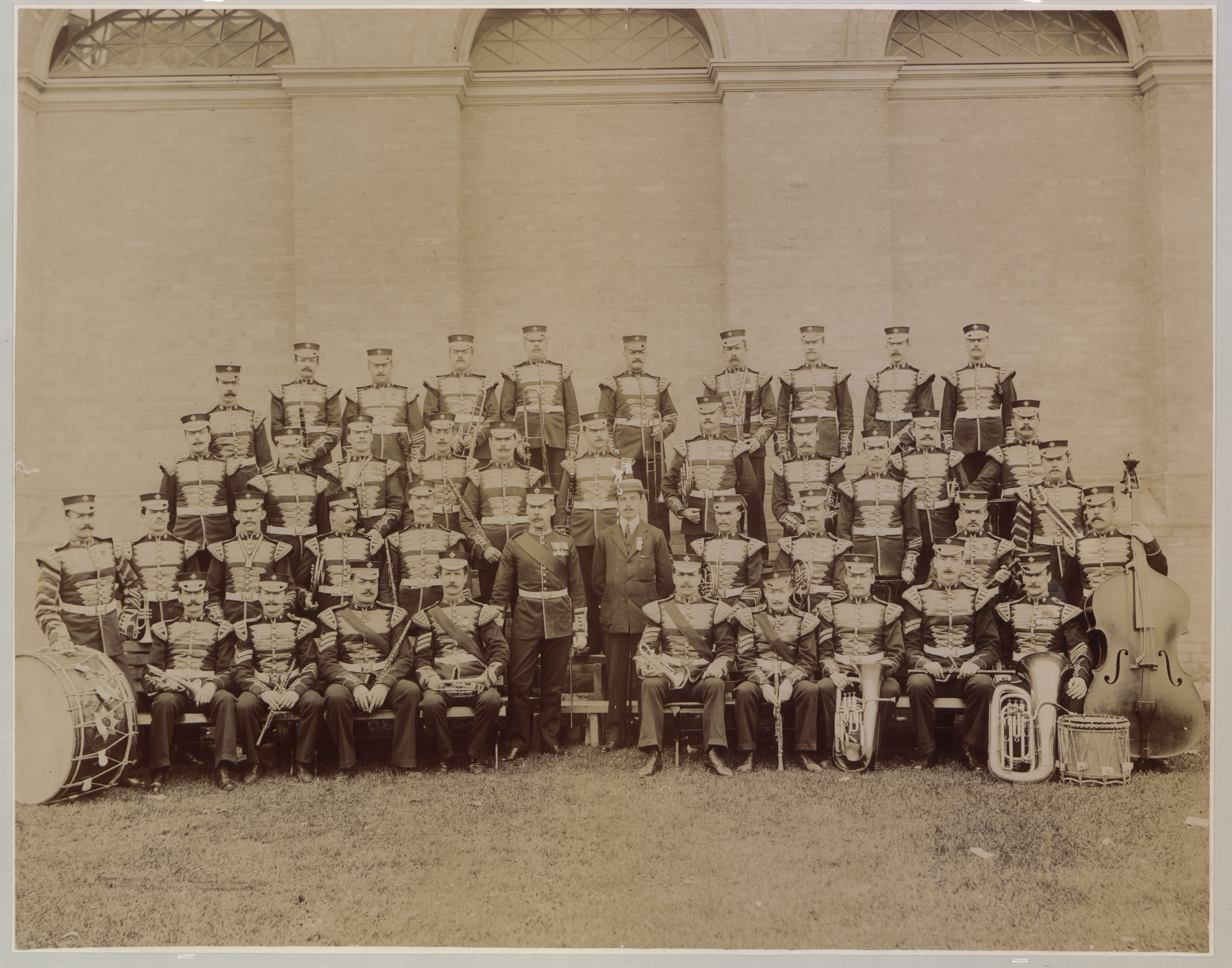
Band of the Irish Guards in Toronto in 1905

The Irish Guards was formed on 1 April 1900 to commemorate the bravery of the many Irish regiments which fought in the South African campaigns. Under the direction of its first Bandmaster, Warrant Officer Charles Hassell, the Regimental Band made its first public appearance the following year. The Band quickly gained a reputation for excellence as evidenced by the glowing press reports in 1905 for what turned out to be the first of many tours of Canada. The citizens of Toronto were so impressed with its performance that they presented the Band with an ornate silver cup, which remains one of its cherished possessions to this day.

On 23 January 1923, the Band made what is believed to be the very first broadcast by a military band, the programme being broadcast live on the 2LO station from a studio in Marconi House in The Strand.

In the 1950s the Band was chosen to give the UK premier performance of Paul Hindemith's 'Symphony for Concert Band'. In 1948, the Band travelled to Palestine to support the Guards battalions involved in the troubles. Sadly, during this time the Band was ambushed and one member, Lance Corporal Ted Jones, was shot and killed. He is buried in Sarafand Military Cemetery.

The Band has also made numerous appearances on television and in films, including The Ipcress File, and Oh! What a Lovely War, as well as being engaged to whistle 'Colonel Bogey' for the soundtrack of The Bridge on the River Kwai. A number of former Band members have continued their musical careers with national orchestras, including the Hallé, the BBC Symphony and the Royal Opera House, Covent Garden.

Two former Directors of Music, Major George Willcocks and Lieutenant Colonel 'Jiggs' Jaeger, also conducted the Black Dyke Mills Band at the National Brass Band Championships.

Over the years the Band has toured extensively, including a visit to Japan in 1972, where it was accorded the honour of being the first foreign band ever to play in the Imperial Palace in the presence of the Empress and the two Crown Princesses.

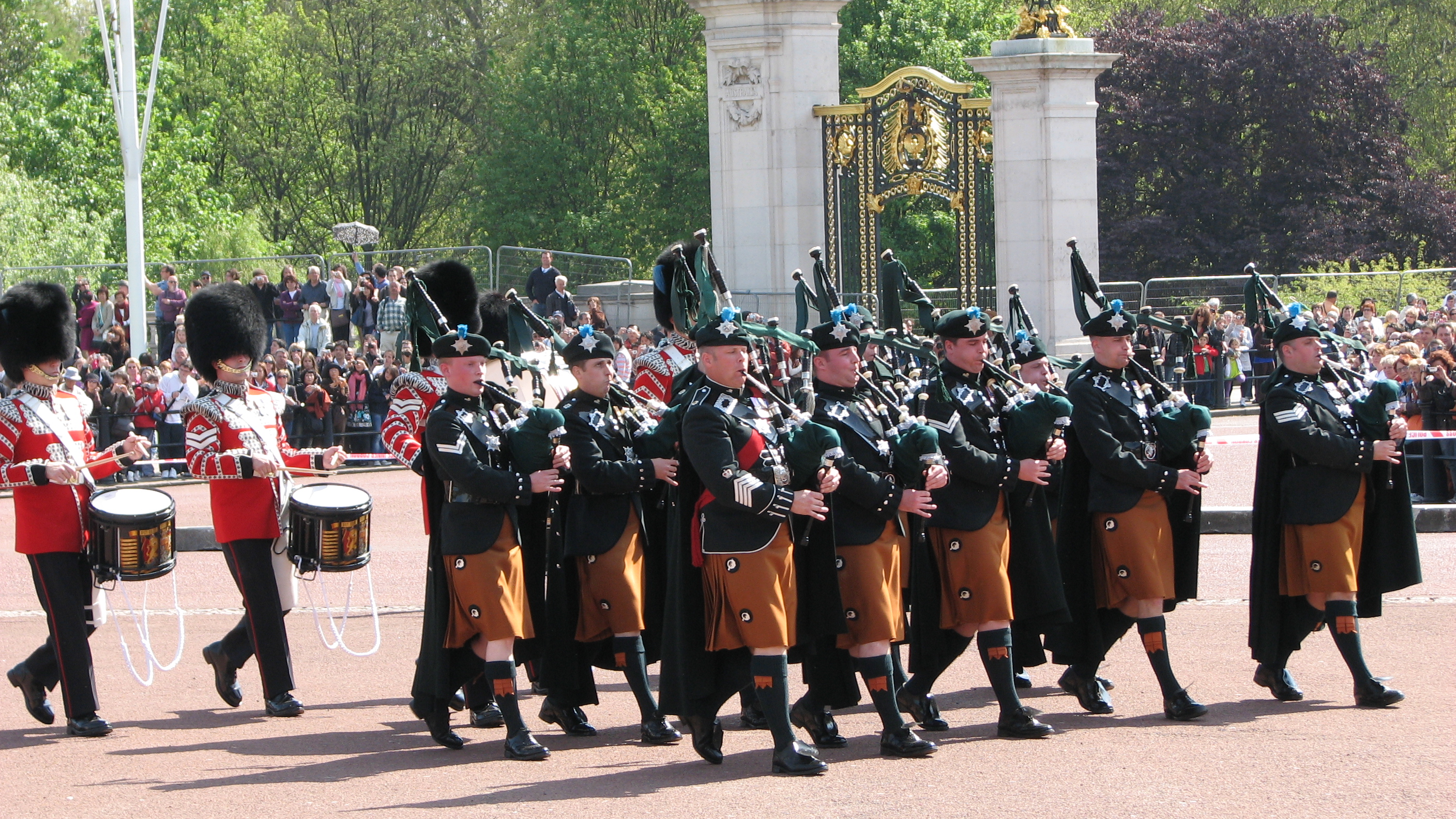
The Drums and Pipes of the Irish Guards, 2009.

== Pipe majors ==
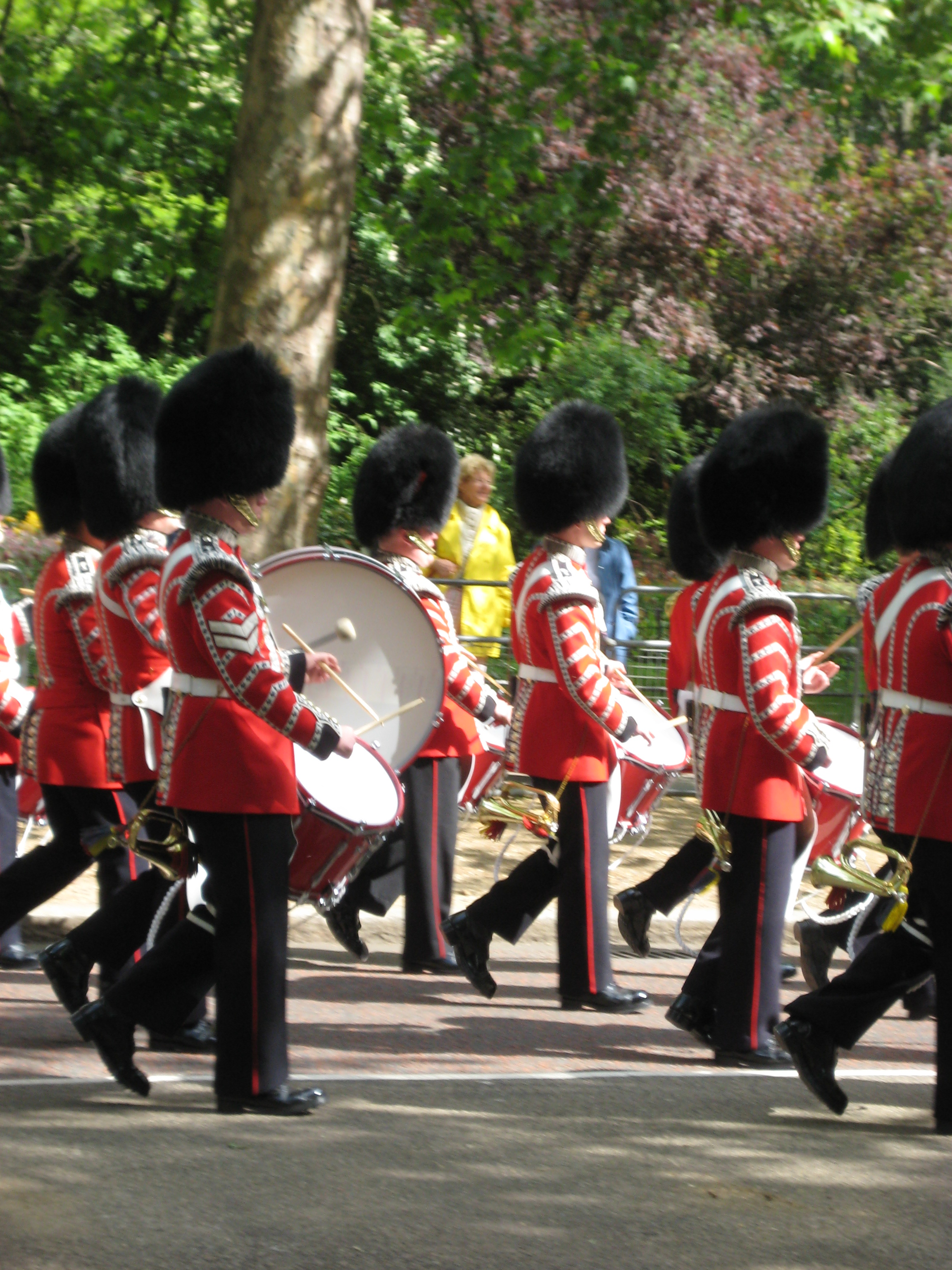
Corps of Drums, Irish Guards

Original title of "Sergeant Piper" was changed to "Pipe Major" via Army Order 139 of 1928, change to date from 31 July 1928. On St. Patrick's Day 1991, the Queen Mother presented the regiment with its first-ever pipe banner. This is carried by the pipe major on the bass drone of his pipes when a member of the Royal Family is present. In 2013, Pipe Major David Rogers became the first Irish Guards piper to be appointed "Personal Piper to Her Majesty the Queen."

== See also ==
- Coldstream Guards Band
- Grenadier Guards Band
- Scots Guards Band
- Welsh Guards Band
- Household Division
