= Gaingels =

American venture capital firm focused on LGBT investments

Gaingels Ventures LLC
- Type: Private
- Industry: Venture Capital
- Founded: 2014; 12 years ago
- Founders: David Beatty; Paul Grossinger
- Headquarters: Burlington, Vermont, U.S.
- Key people: Jennifer Jeronimo (CEO)
- AUM: US$600 million (January 2022)
- Website: www.gaingels.com

Gaingels is an American venture capital firm headquartered in Burlington, Vermont. The firm focuses on investing in companies with diverse and underrepresented (including LGBTQIA+) leadership as well as progressive social values.

== Background ==
Gaingels was co-founded in 2014 by David Beatty and Paul Grossinger. The name Gaingels is a mix of "gay angels" and "gaining from angels". It started as a small angel investor group syndicate made up of LGBTQIA+ investors that would invest in companies founded by those in the LGBTQIA+ community.

in 2018, the founders recognized the lack of diversity in the venture capital scene and how investors would discriminate against company founders who did not fit the traditional mold such as being gay, female or being from a minority group. The firm's mission was expanded to foster social change through investing and to create a more diverse and inclusive environment in the venture capital scene. The firm which originally focused on just investing in LGBTQIA+ founded and led startups expanded its scope to invest in more companies to bring more diversity to its investments. It would also help its portfolio companies improve its diversity at leadership level.

Gaingels' investments have grown from $5 million in 2018 to $50 million in the first eight months of 2020 as a result of its structural change. Gaingels also partnered with other investors allowing it to obtain more deals.

In 2020, Gaingels launched its scholarship program to support LGBTQIA+ students.

Outside the U.S., Gaingels has offices in Australia, London and Toronto.

== Investments ==
- Binance.US
- BlockFi
- Databricks
- Finless Foods
- Grove Collaborative
- MasterClass
- S'More
