= The jig is up =

The jig is up may refer to:

- "The Jig Is Up", a 1993 song by Jim Witter from his self-titled album
- "The Jig Is Up", a 1995 song by Jill Sobule from her self-titled album
- The Jig Is Up, a 2004 album by American fiddle player Peter Stampfel
- "The Jig Is Up", a 2008 song by Edison Glass, from their album Time Is Fiction
- "The Jig Is Up", a 2010 song by Quasi, from their album American Gong

== See also ==
- Jig (disambiguation)
