= Jigsaw (dating app) =

Jigsaw Dating
- Operating system: Android and iOS
- Available in: English
- Type: Online dating
- License: Proprietary software with Terms of Use
- Website: jigsaw.co

Jigsaw Dating (formerly known as JigTalk, and formerly a dating app) is a US-based company that organises in-person ("IRL") singles events across more than 30 US cities, supported by a companion mobile application. The company was originally known for a dating app in which a user's profile photo was concealed by a digital jigsaw puzzle that revealed itself piece by piece through message exchanges, a concept granted a US patent in early 2021. In 2024, the company shifted its focus to in-person dating events. By 2026, Jigsaw described itself as the nation's largest in-person dating event company, hosting speed dating, mixers and themed events to help singles meet offline.

== History ==
In 2016, Alex Durrant and Max Adamski released a beta app called JigTalk, which covered and revealed entire user photos based on the word count of the messages sent. Later, JigTalk became the first British company to enter and graduate from NASDAQ's Milestone Makers incubator in San Francisco. JigTalk officially launched the application in London in 2019. During the COVID-19 lockdown, the company rebranded to Jigsaw covering only the users' faces and launched in the US in 2021. In February 2021, the application received seed funding of £2.7 million ($3.7 million) from The Relationship Corp., and other angel investors.

=== Shift to in-person events (2024–2026) ===
In 2024, Jigsaw shifted its business away from its original face-concealing dating app format and toward organising in-person singles events across the United States, while retaining its mobile app as a companion tool for event attendees. In February 2025 a Forbes article titled Does AI Belong In The Dating World? A Psychologist Answers stated Jigsaw was "the biggest real-life dating experience provider in the U.S". The South Florida Sun-Sentinel reported in September 2026 that the company's leadership had transformed it "in June", with singles now meeting first at group events and the app coordinating the experience. By mid-2026, Jigsaw described this transition as complete, reporting more than 200 events per month across over 30 major US cities. Axios characterised the company as the "nation's largest in-person dating event company, hosting speed dating, mixers and themed events." The New York Post noted Jigsaw as among the roving singles events popular in New York City.

The shift was detailed by CEO Alex Durrant at the Global Dating Insights 2026 conference in New York, where it was framed as a response to user fatigue with swipe-based apps and algorithmic matching. The company cited internal research claiming that 97% of users did not want artificial intelligence involved in their dating process, and that 70% would feel betrayed if a match used AI to communicate with them; independent industry commentary noted that the company did not disclose the methodology, sample size, or demographic breakdown behind these figures.

== Patent lawsuit ==
In November 2022, Jigsaw Dating Limited sued competitor S'More for allegedly infringing its patented feature that gradually reveals profile photos during conversations. The feature, protected under U.S. Patent No. 11,483,276, is central to Jigsaw's original focus on personality-driven dating. The lawsuit was settled in February 2023 after S'More removed the contested feature. Jigsaw CEO Alex Durrant stated, "Competition is welcome, but we'll fiercely protect our intellectual property." Following the lawsuit, Jigsaw shifted its primary focus from the face-concealing app format toward in-person dating events, as described above.

== Sources ==
- Staff (24 November 2016). "Love is in the air as angels invest £160,000 in Leeds dating entrepreneurs". The Business Desk.
- Winter, Lottie (19 November 2019). "This dating app has banned photo filters, claiming 'catfishing' is out of control". Glamour UK.
- Fulton, Kane (23 January 2017). "Love at first type: meet the messaging-led dating app taking on Tinder". TechRadar.
- Gay, Chloe (26 July 2017). "Blind Dating App JigTalk Becomes First British Business Accepted Onto NASDAQ's Startup Programme". Global Dating Insights.
- Staff (28 October 2020). "New research reveals two thirds of dating app users are sick of being judged only on looks want a better alternative". The Digital Newsroom.
- TV Anchor (5 November 2020). "UK's Jigsaw Dating App Launches in NYC". Cheddar News.
- Lomas, Natasha (15 February 2021). "Jigsaw scores $3.7M to slow down your dating swipes". TechCrunch.
- Iovine, Anna (8 February 2021). "8 Dating Apps That Are Bucking Against Tinder's Model". Mashable.
- Marzook, Safiya (15 February 2021). "Jigsaw Dating secures £2.7 million Seed investment led by The Relationship Corp". UK Tech Investment News.
- Scholer, Kristen (5 November 2020). "Jigsaw Dating App Focuses On Conversation Over Selfies". Cheddar News.
- Stodart, Leah (31 January 2022). "The best dating sites for finding a boo before spring". Mashable.
- Pardes, Arielle (21 June 2021). "A New Wave of Dating Apps Takes Cues From TikTok and Gen Z". Wired.
- Dawes, Jack (27 November 2020). "Can Jigsaw Make Us Less Superficial? We Sure Hope So". AskMen.
- "Jigsaw® Dating on LinkedIn: Today, we filed a lawsuit against S'more". LinkedIn.
- Nolan, Sean (8 February 2023). "Jigsaw Settles Lawsuit Against S'More". Global Dating Insights.
- Staff (17 June 2026). "Jigsaw Dating Completes Major Pivot to IRL Hybrid Service". Global Dating Insights.
- Staff (2026). "Jigsaw's Offline Pivot Challenges AI-Driven Dating". Dating Industry Insights.
- Rankin, McKenzie (13 July 2026). "8 Charlotte dating groups hosting speed dating and singles events". Axios Charlotte.
- Palladino, Andrea (13 July 2026). "Beyond the apps: how NYC venues are monetizing the singles scene". New York Post.
- Solomon, Lois K. (9 September 2026). "Swiping fatigue is real — and singles are finding new ways to meet IRL". South Florida Sun-Sentinel.
- Travers, Mark (14 February 2025). "Does AI Belong In The Dating World? A Psychologist Answers". Forbes.
