= PGPCoder =

Computer ransomware

Gpcode

Malware details
- Technical name: Trojan.PGPCoder, Virus.Win32.Gpcode, TROJ_PGPCODER.[letter] (Trend Micro)
- Classification: Trojan
- Isolation date: May 20, 2005

PGPCoder or GPCode is a trojan that encrypts files on the infected computer and then asks for a ransom in order to release these files, a type of behavior dubbed ransomware or cryptovirology.

== Trojan ==
Once installed on a computer, the trojan creates two registry keys: one to ensure it is run on every system startup, and the second to monitor the progress of the trojan in the infected computer, counting the number of files that have been analyzed by the malicious code.

Once it has been run, the trojan embarks on its mission, which is to encrypt, using a digital encryption key, all the files it finds on computer drives with extensions corresponding to those listed in its code. These extensions include .doc, .html, .jpg, .xls, .zip, and .rar.

The blackmail is completed with the trojan dropping a text file in each directory, with instructions to the victim of what to do. An email address is supplied through which users are supposed to request for their files to be released after paying a ransom of $100–200 to an e-gold or Liberty Reserve account.

== Efforts to combat the trojan ==
While a few Gpcode variants have been successfully implemented, many variants have flaws that allow users to recover data without paying the ransom fee. The first versions of Gpcode used a custom-written encryption routine that was easily broken. Variant Gpcode.ak writes the encrypted file to a new location, and deletes the unencrypted file, and this allows an undeletion utility to recover some of the files. Once some encrypted+unencrypted pairs have been found, this sometimes gives enough information to decrypt other files. Variant Gpcode.am uses symmetric encryption, which made key recovery very easy. In late November 2010, a new version called Gpcode.ax was reported. It uses stronger encryption (RSA-1024 and AES-256) and physically overwrites the encrypted file, making recovery nearly impossible.

Kaspersky Lab has been able to make contact with the author of the program, and verify that the individual is the real author, but have so far been unable to determine his real world identity.

== See also ==
- Archiveus
- Krotten
