= AIDS (Trojan horse) =

First known ransomware

PC Cyborg Trojan
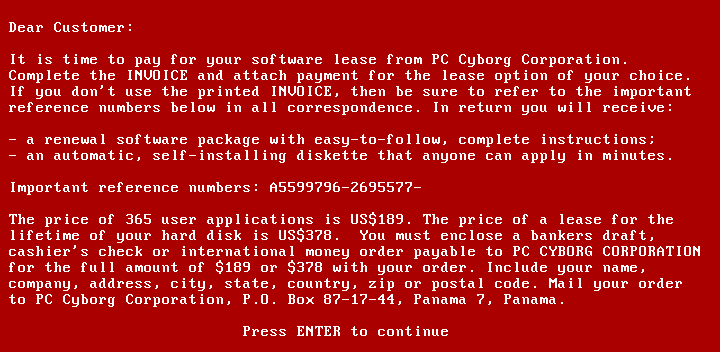
- Message after activation of AIDS

Malware details
- Technical name: Aids Info Disk/PC Cyborg Trojan
- Aliases: AIDS!Trojan, Aidsinfo. A trojan, Aidsinfo. B trojan, Cyborg, Trj/AidsInfo. A, Trojan. AidsInfo.a, Trj/AidsInfo. B, Trojan. AidsInfo.b, Trojaids!Trojan, Love virus
- Type: DOS
- Subtype: DOS scrambler
- Classification: Trojan
- Family: AIDS Trojan
- Isolation date: 1989
- Origin: United States
- Author: Dr. Joseph Popp

AIDS, also known as Aids Info Drive or PC Cyborg Trojan, is a DOS trojan horse whose payload mungs and encrypts the names of all directories on drive C:. It was developed by Dr. Joseph Popp (1950–2006), an evolutionary biologist with a doctorate from Harvard. The virus was isolated in 1989. It is the first documented example of ransomware.

== Description ==
AIDS replaces the AUTOEXEC.BAT file, which would then be used by AIDS to count the number of times the computer has booted. Once this boot count reaches 90, AIDS hides directories and encrypts the names of all files on drive C: (rendering the system unusable), at which time the user is asked to "renew the license" and contact PC Cyborg Corporation for payment (which would involve sending US$189 to a post office box in Panama). There exists more than one version of AIDS, and at least one version does not wait to mung drive C:, but will hide directories and encrypt file names upon the first boot after AIDS is installed. The AIDS software also presented to the user an end-user license agreement, some of which read:

If you install [this] on a microcomputer...

then under terms of this license you agree to pay PC Cyborg Corporation in full for the cost of leasing these programs...

In the case of your breach of this license agreement, PC Cyborg reserves the right to take legal action necessary to recover any outstanding debts payable to PC Cyborg Corporation and to use program mechanisms to ensure termination of your use...

These program mechanisms will adversely affect other program applications...

You are hereby advised of the most serious consequences of your failure to abide by the terms of this license agreement; your conscience may haunt you for the rest of your life...

and your [PC] will stop functioning normally...

You are strictly prohibited from sharing [this product] with others...

AIDS is considered to be an early example of a class of malware known as "ransomware".

== History ==
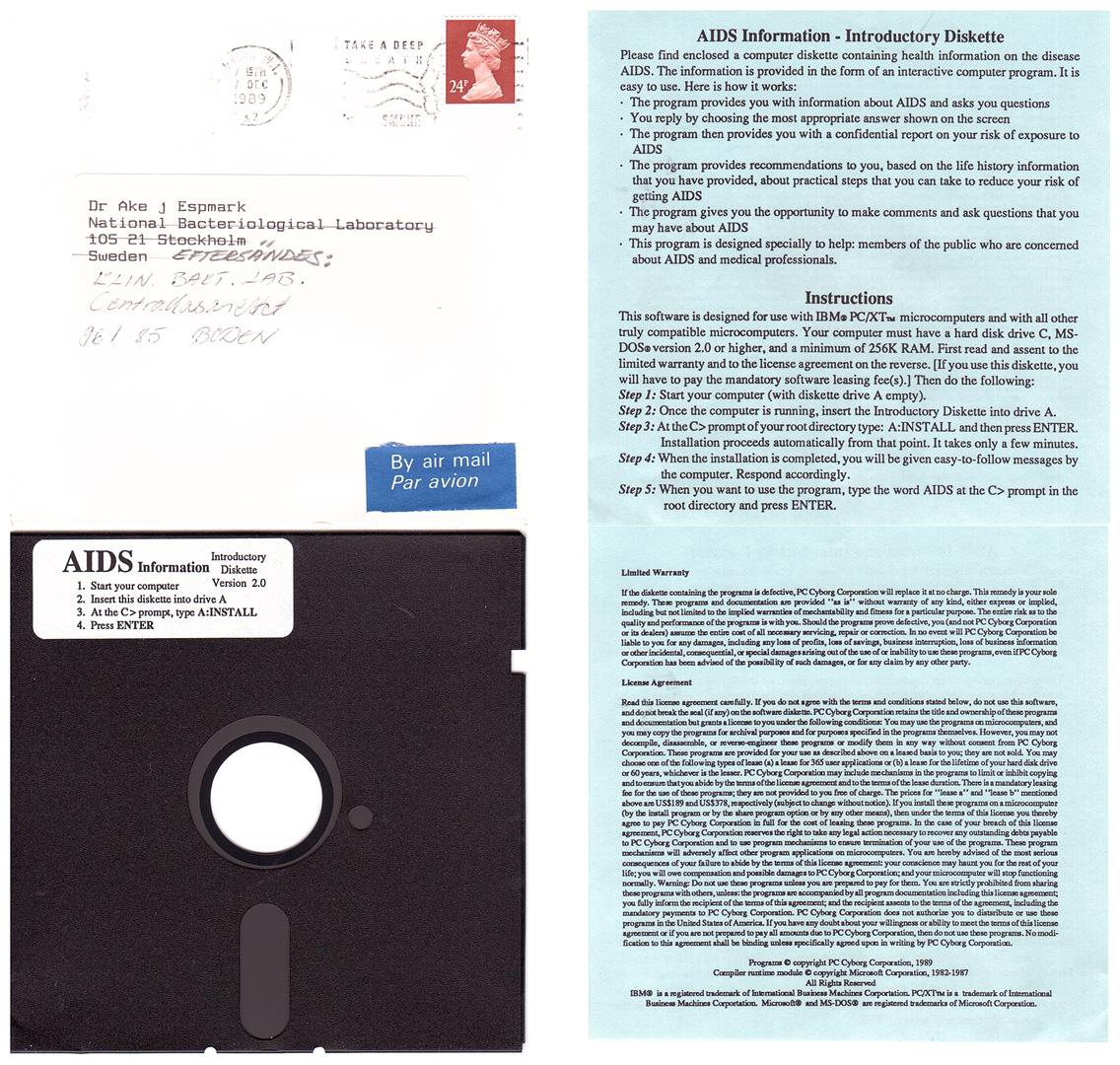
The "AIDS Information Introductory Diskette" and accompanying documentation

AIDS was introduced into systems through a floppy disk called the "AIDS Information Introductory Diskette", which had been mailed to a mailing list. Harvard-taught evolutionary biologist Dr. Joseph Popp was identified as the author of the AIDS trojan horse and was a subscriber to this list.

Popp was eventually discovered by the British anti-virus industry and named on a New Scotland Yard arrest warrant. He was detained in Brixton Prison. Though charged with eleven counts of blackmail and clearly tied to the AIDS trojan, Popp defended himself by saying money going to the PC Cyborg Corporation was to go to AIDS research. A Harvard-trained anthropologist, Popp was associated with the Flying Doctors, a branch of the African Medical Research Foundation (AMREF), and a consultant for the WHO in Kenya, where he had organized a conference in the new Global AIDS Program.

Popp behaved erratically from the day of his arrest during a routine baggage inspection at Amsterdam Schiphol Airport. He was eventually declared mentally unfit to stand trial and was returned to the United States.

Jim Bates analyzed the AIDS Trojan in detail and published his findings in the Virus Bulletin. He wrote that the AIDS Trojan did not alter the contents of any of the user's files, just their file names. He explained that once the extension and filename encryption tables are known, restoration is possible. AIDSOUT was a reliable removal program for the Trojan and the CLEARAID program recovered encrypted plaintext after the Trojan triggered. CLEARAID automatically reversed the encryption without having to contact the extortionist.

The AIDS Trojan was analyzed even further a few years later. Young and Yung pointed out the fatal weakness in malware such as the AIDS Trojan, namely, the reliance on symmetric cryptography. They showed how to use public key cryptography to implement a secure information extortion attack. They published this discovery (and expanded upon it) in a 1996 IEEE Security and Privacy paper. A cryptovirus, cryptotrojan, or cryptoworm hybrid encrypts the victim's files using the public key of the author and the victim must pay (with money, information, etc.) to obtain the needed session key. This is one of many attacks, both overt and covert, in the field known as cryptovirology.
