= Hidden Tear =

Open-source ransomware trojan

Malware details
- Technical name: Ransom.MSIL.Tear
- Type: Ransomware
- Subtype: Cryptovirus
- Classification: Trojan horse
- Origin: Istanbul, Turkey
- Author: Utku Sen

Technical details
- Platform: Microsoft Windows
- Written in: C#

Hidden Tear is the first open-source ransomware trojan that targets computers running Microsoft Windows. The original sample was posted in August 2015 to GitHub.

When Hidden Tear is activated, it encrypts certain types of files using a symmetric AES algorithm, then sends the symmetric key to the malware's control servers. However, as Utku Sen claimed "All my malware codes are backdoored on purpose", Hidden Tear has an encryption backdoor, thus allowing him to crack various samples.
