= Alan Newman (entrepreneur) =

American serial entrepreneur

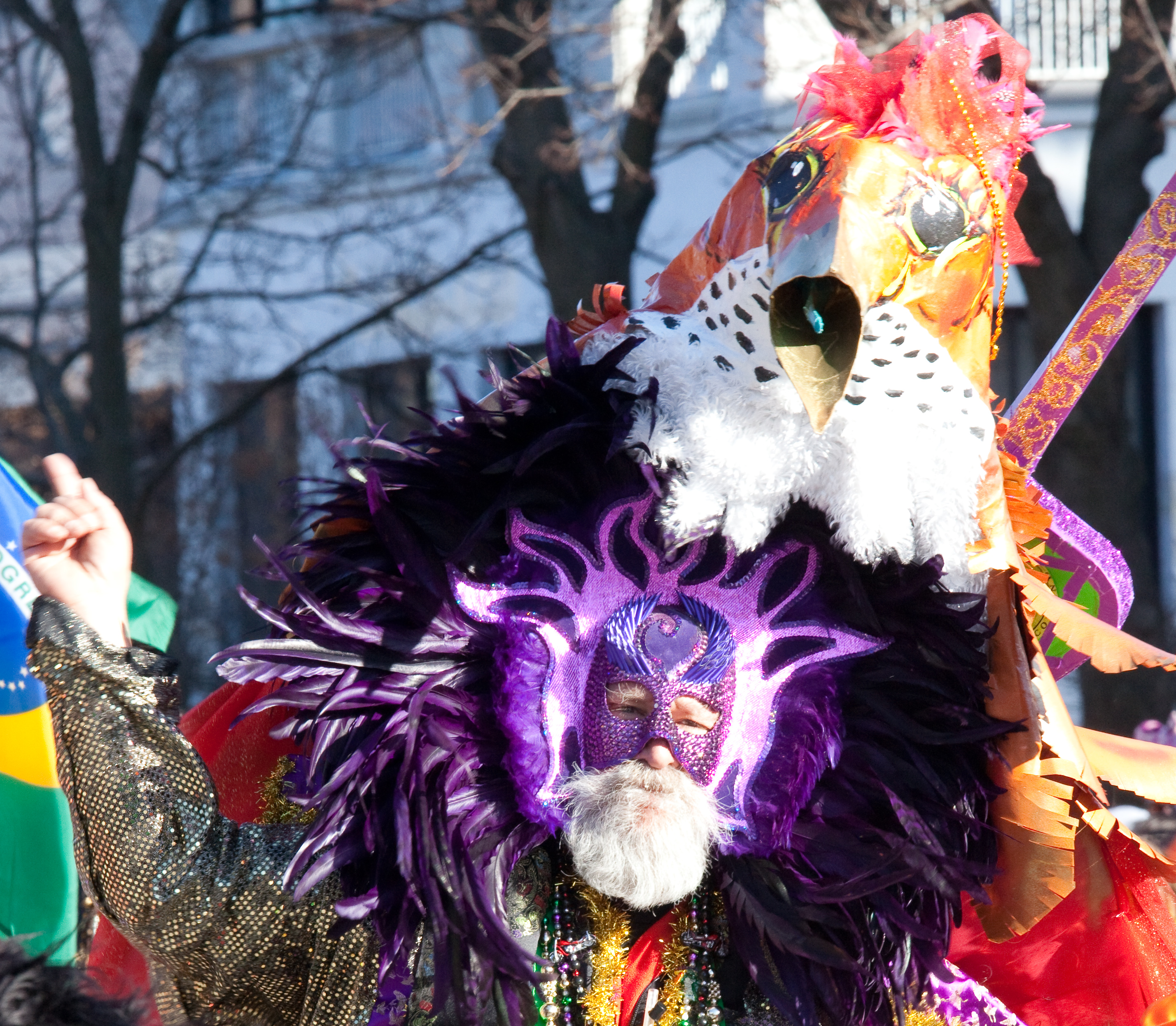
- Alan Newman in the Magic Hat Mardi Gras Parade. February 28, 2009
- Born: 1946 (age 79–80); United States
- Occupation: Entrepreneur
- Known for: Magic Hat Brewing Company, Seventh Generation Inc., Gardener's Supply Company

Alan Newman is an American serial entrepreneur based in the U.S. state of Vermont, who co-founded Gardener's Supply Company, Seventh Generation Inc., Magic Hat Brewing Company, and Alchemy & Science, Boston Beer Company's “incubator business.”

== Life and career ==
Originally from Long Island, New York, Newman spent a year at Parsons College in Iowa before dropping out and moving to the Haight-Ashbury district of San Francisco. Newman returned home, enrolled in Long Island University in Southampton and graduated on the deans list after recovering from an encounter with police where he was caught with a small amount of pills and marijuana. Newman then moved to Burlington, Vermont, in 1970, after living on a commune in Oregon.

Newman's business career as an entrepreneur began in 1983, when he helped found Gardener's Supply Company with his friend Will Raap. He co-founded Seventh Generation Inc. in 1988, but was later forced out amid business difficulties in 1992. In 1994 he co-founded Magic Hat Brewing Company and served as CEO, before leaving in 2010. In 2011, Newman was recruited by Boston Beer Company's chairman Jim Koch to run Alchemy & Science, a subsidiary devoted to developing new beer lines for the company. Newman developed brands such as Traveler Beer Company, a line of shandies; Coney Island Brewery; Concrete Beach Brewery; and Angel City Brewery. Newman authored a book, High on Business: The Life, Times, and Lessons of a Serial Entrepreneur, in 2011, which includes a foreword and afterword by friends Ben Cohen and Jerry Greenfield, of Ben & Jerry's Ice Cream. On January 25, 2016, Newman bought out the co-founder of Higher Ground Nightclub, a nightclub in the Burlington, Vermont area that has operated since 1998. He also serves on the steering committee of the Vermont Cannabis Collaborative, an organization supporting the development of the Vermont cannabis industry. He has a daughter, Zoë.

== Controversy ==
In 2021, an employee of Higher Ground made a series of allegations against Newman and his Higher Ground co-owner in the VTDigger. According to the allegations, Newman failed to confront sexual misconduct, sexual assault, and the verbal abuse of women and non-binary employees that happened under his watch. Newman also allegedly told rape jokes and engaged in sexist behavior himself.

Newman's Higher Ground co-owner, Alex Crothers, responded by saying that while he believed the employee's experiences were real, he did not think it accurately described Higher Ground as it currently exists.
