= Gardener's Supply Company =

American gardening product company

- Area served: Worldwide
- Key people: Will Raap, Co-Founder/Chairman. Alan Newman, Co-Founder.
- Products: Gardening items
- Number of employees: 220 (2014)
- Website: www.gardeners.com

Gardener's Supply Company is a privately owned company providing environmentally friendly gardening products and information through its website, catalogs, and retail stores.

The Gardener’s Supply Company headquarters in Burlington, Vermont, include administrative offices, a retail store and display gardens. Additional retail stores and display gardens are located in Williston, Vermont; Lebanon, New Hampshire; Greenland, New Hampshire; and Hadley, Massachusetts.

Gardener's Supply Company is no longer a B Corp-certified.

On June 20, 2025, Gardener's Supply Company filed for Chapter 11 bankruptcy in Delaware, listing assets between $1 million and $10 million and liabilities between $10 million and $50 million.

== Employee Stock Ownership Plan ==
In December 2009, founder Will Raap sold the majority ownership of Gardener’s Supply Company to its employees, officially making the company 100% employee-owned through its Employee Stock Ownership Plan (ESOP). The ESOP was adopted in 1987 to allow all employees to earn stock and share in company profits. Current CEO Jim Feinson said the employee-owned company has also developed "a community culture of support" that offers benefits and flexibility to its employees, including encouraging them to make their own schedules.

== Founder, Will Raap ==
In 1983, his interest in food systems led gardener and businessman Will Raap to co-found Gardener's Supply with co-founder Alan Newman. He moved his company to five acres at the entrance to the Intervale, 350 acres of neglected land located in Burlington, Vermont, in 1985. Raap also helped found the non-profit Intervale Center in 1988. As of 2014 it is home to several sustainable businesses in addition to Gardener's Supply Company, including food and flower farms, a café and a market. Raap died in 2022.

== Community involvement and support ==
Gardener's Supply Company no longer donates 8% of pre-tax profits to gardening-related community programs and organizations. Organizations supported by Gardener’s Supply include the American Community Gardening Association (ACGA), the Green Education Foundation (GEF) and AmpleHarvest.org.

The company established the Garden Crusader Awards to honor individuals who improve their communities through gardening.
