= Jigsaw Islands =

Two islands in Palmer Archipelago, Antarctica

- Location within Antarctica

Geography
- Location: Antarctica
- Coordinates: 64°54′S 63°37′W
- Archipelago: Palmer Archipelago
- Total islands: 2

Administration
- Administered under the Antarctic Treaty System

Demographics
- Population: Uninhabited

The Jigsaw Islands are two small islands lying off the southwest end of Wiencke Island, in the Palmer Archipelago, Antarctica. One of the islands was used as a main triangulation station by the British Naval Hydrographic Survey Unit in 1956–57, and by the Falkland Islands and Dependencies Aerial Survey Expedition in March 1957. The islands were so named by the UK Antarctic Place-Names Committee because of the difficulty with which the station was recovered, the surveyors piecing together the available information bit by bit to narrow down the exact spot on the island where the station had been established.

== See also ==
- List of Antarctic and sub-Antarctic islands
