= Ransomware =

Malicious software used in ransom demands

Ransomware is a type of malware that takes the private data of a victim hostage until a ransom is paid. This can involve encryption of the data, and/or exfiltration with the threat of publicly releasing the data. Ransom is typically requested to be paid via cryptocurrency or stored-value cards since these are harder to trace; making the crime more difficult to prosecute. Sometimes the original files can be retrieved without paying the ransom due to implementation mistakes, leaked cryptographic keys or a complete lack of encryption in the ransomware.

Ransomware attacks are typically carried out using a Trojan disguised as a legitimate file that the user is tricked into downloading or opening when it arrives as an email attachment. However, one high-profile example, the WannaCry worm, traveled automatically between computers without user interaction.

Starting as early as 1989 with the first documented ransomware known as the AIDS trojan, the use of ransomware scams grew internationally. There were 181.5 million ransomware attacks worldwide in the first six months of 2018, 229% more than the first six months of 2017. In June 2014, security software company McAfee released data showing that it had collected more than double the number of ransomware samples that quarter than it had in the same quarter the previous year. CryptoLocker was particularly successful, procuring an estimated US$3 million before it was taken down by authorities, and CryptoWall was estimated by the US Federal Bureau of Investigation (FBI) to have accrued over US$18 million by June 2015. In 2020, the US Internet Crime Complaint Center (IC3) received 2,474 complaints identified as ransomware, with adjusted losses of over $29.1 million. The losses could exceed this amount, according to the FBI. In 2025, IC3 recorded 3,611 ransomware complaints and reported losses of more than $32 million; the FBI cautions that this figure leaves out costs such as lost business and remediation, and that some victims report no loss at all. Globally, according to Statista, there were about 623 million ransomware attacks in 2021, and 493 million in 2022.

Ransomware payments were estimated at $1.1 billion in 2019, $999m in 2020, a record $1.25bn in 2023, and a sharp drop to $813m in 2024, attributed to non-payment by victims and action by law enforcement.

== Operation ==
The concept of file-encrypting ransomware was invented and implemented by Young and Yung at Columbia University and was presented at the 1996 IEEE Security & Privacy conference. It is called cryptoviral extortion and it was inspired by the fictional facehugger in the movie Alien. Cryptoviral extortion is the following three-round protocol carried out between the attacker and the victim.

1. [attacker→victim] The attacker generates a key pair and places the corresponding public key in the malware. The malware is released.
2. [victim→attacker] To carry out the cryptoviral extortion attack, the malware generates a random symmetric key and encrypts the victim's data with it. It uses the public key in the malware to encrypt the symmetric key. This is known as hybrid encryption and it results in a small asymmetric ciphertext as well as the symmetric ciphertext of the victim's data. It zeroizes the symmetric key and the original plaintext data to prevent recovery. It puts up a message to the user that includes the asymmetric ciphertext and how to pay the ransom. The victim sends the asymmetric ciphertext and e-money to the attacker.
3. [attacker→victim] The attacker receives the payment, deciphers the asymmetric ciphertext with the attacker's private key, and sends the symmetric key to the victim. The victim deciphers the encrypted data with the needed symmetric key thereby completing the cryptovirology attack.

The symmetric key is randomly generated and will not assist other victims. At no point is the attacker's private key exposed to victims and the victim need only send a very small ciphertext (the encrypted symmetric-cipher key) to the attacker.

Ransomware attacks are typically carried out using a Trojan, entering a system through, for example, a malicious attachment, an embedded link in a phishing email, or a vulnerability in a network service. The program then runs a payload, which locks the system in some fashion, or claims to lock the system but does not (e.g., a scareware program). Payloads may display a fake warning purportedly by an entity such as a law enforcement agency, falsely claiming that the system has been used for illegal activities, contains content such as pornography and "pirated" media.

Some payloads consist simply of an application designed to lock or restrict the system until payment is made, typically by setting the Windows Shell to itself, or even modifying the master boot record and/or partition table to prevent the operating system from booting until it is repaired. The most sophisticated payloads encrypt files, with many using strong encryption to encrypt the victim's files in such a way that only the malware author has the needed decryption key.

Payment is virtually always the goal, and the victim is coerced into paying for the ransomware to be removed either by supplying a program that can decrypt the files, or by sending an unlock code that undoes the payload's changes. While the attacker may simply take the money without returning the victim's files, it is in the attacker's best interest to perform the decryption as agreed, since victims will stop sending payments if it becomes known that they serve no purpose. A key element in making ransomware work for the attacker is a convenient payment system that is hard to trace. A range of such payment methods have been used, including wire transfers, premium-rate text messages, pre-paid voucher services such as paysafecard, and the Bitcoin cryptocurrency.

In May 2020, vendor Sophos reported that the global average cost to remediate a ransomware attack (considering downtime, people time, device cost, network cost, lost opportunity and ransom paid) was $761,106. Ninety-four percent of organizations had their data restored, with 56% of ransomware victims retrieving data from backups, as opposed to 26% when paying the ransom.

== History ==
=== Encrypting ransomware ===
The first known malware extortion attack, the "AIDS Trojan" written by Joseph Popp in 1989, had a design failure so severe it was not necessary to pay the extortionist at all. Its payload hid the files on the hard drive and encrypted only their names, and displayed a message claiming that the user's license to use a certain piece of software had expired. The user was asked to pay US$189 to "PC Cyborg Corporation" in order to obtain a repair tool even though the decryption key could be extracted from the code of the Trojan. The Trojan was also known as "PC Cyborg". Popp was declared mentally unfit to stand trial for his actions, but he promised to donate the profits from the malware to fund AIDS research.

The idea of abusing anonymous cash systems to safely collect ransom from human kidnapping was introduced in 1992 by Sebastiaan von Solms and David Naccache. This electronic money collection method was also proposed for cryptoviral extortion attacks. In the von Solms-Naccache scenario a newspaper publication was used (since Bitcoin ledgers did not exist at the time the paper was written).

The notion of using public key cryptography for data kidnapping attacks was introduced in 1996 by Adam L. Young and Moti Yung. Young and Yung critiqued the failed AIDS Information Trojan that relied on symmetric cryptography alone, the fatal flaw being that the decryption key could be extracted from the Trojan, and implemented an experimental proof-of-concept cryptovirus on a Macintosh SE/30 that used RSA and the Tiny Encryption Algorithm (TEA) to hybrid encrypt the victim's data. Since public key cryptography is used, the virus only contains the encryption key. The attacker keeps the corresponding private decryption key private. Young and Yung's original experimental cryptovirus had the victim send the asymmetric ciphertext to the attacker who deciphers it and returns the symmetric decryption key it contains to the victim for a fee. Long before electronic money existed Young and Yung proposed that electronic money could be extorted through encryption as well, stating that "the virus writer can effectively hold all of the money ransom until half of it is given to him. Even if the e-money was previously encrypted by the user, it is of no use to the user if it gets encrypted by a cryptovirus". They referred to these attacks as being "cryptoviral extortion", an overt attack that is part of a larger class of attacks in a field called cryptovirology, which encompasses both overt and covert attacks. The cryptoviral extortion protocol was inspired by the parasitic relationship between H. R. Giger's facehugger and its host in the movie Alien.

Examples of extortionate ransomware became prominent in May 2005. By mid-2006, Trojans such as Gpcode, TROJ_RANSOM, Archiveus, Krotten, Cryzip, and MayArchive began utilizing more sophisticated RSA encryption schemes, with ever-increasing key-sizes. Gpcode.AG, which was detected in June 2006, was encrypted with a 660-bit RSA public key. In June 2008, a variant known as Gpcode.AK was detected. Using a 1024-bit RSA key, it was believed large enough to be computationally infeasible to break without a concerted distributed effort.

Encrypting ransomware returned to prominence in late 2013 with the propagation of CryptoLocker—using the Bitcoin digital currency platform to collect ransom money. In December 2013, ZDNet estimated based on Bitcoin transaction information that between 15 October and 18 December, the operators of CryptoLocker had procured about US$27 million from infected users. The CryptoLocker technique was widely copied in the months following, including CryptoLocker 2.0 (thought not to be related to CryptoLocker), CryptoDefense (which initially contained a major design flaw that stored the private key on the infected system in a user-retrievable location, due to its use of Windows' built-in encryption APIs), and the August 2014 discovery of a Trojan specifically targeting network-attached storage devices produced by Synology. In January 2015, it was reported that ransomware-styled attacks have occurred against individual websites via hacking, and through ransomware designed to target Linux-based web servers.

Notably, in 2020, the Ransomware-as-a-service (RaaS) Thanos tool was written in C# and made by a Venezualen-French cardiologist Moises Luis Zagala Gonzalez. It is one of the first ransomware softwares to use the RIPlace to bypass antivirus techniques.

In 2022, Costa Rica received widespread Conti ransomware attacks affecting government, healthcare and industry. This led President Rodrigo Chaves to declare a state of emergency and announce that Costa Rica is "at war" with its ransomware hackers.

In some infections, there is a two-stage payload, common in many malware systems. The user is tricked into running a script, which downloads the main virus and executes it. In early versions of the dual-payload system, the script was contained in a Microsoft Office document with an attached VBScript macro, or in a windows scripting facility (WSF) file. As detection systems started blocking these first stage payloads, the Microsoft Malware Protection Center identified a trend away toward LNK files with self-contained Microsoft Windows PowerShell scripts. In 2016, PowerShell was found to be involved in nearly 40% of endpoint security incidents.

Some ransomware strains have used proxies tied to Tor hidden services to connect to their command and control servers, increasing the difficulty of tracing the exact location of the criminals. Furthermore, dark web vendors have increasingly started to offer the technology as a service, wherein ransomware is sold, ready for deployment on victims' machines, on a subscription basis, similarly to Adobe Creative Cloud or Office 365.

Symantec has classified ransomware to be the most dangerous cyber threat.

=== Non-encrypting ransomware ===
In August 2010, Russian authorities arrested nine individuals connected to a ransomware Trojan known as WinLock. Unlike the previous Gpcode Trojan, WinLock did not use encryption. Instead, WinLock trivially restricted access to the system by displaying pornographic images and asked users to send a premium-rate SMS (costing around US$10) to receive a code that could be used to unlock their machines. The scam hit numerous users across Russia and neighbouring countries—reportedly earning the group over US$16 million.

In 2011, a ransomware Trojan surfaced that imitated the Windows Product Activation notice, and informed users that a system's Windows installation had to be re-activated due to "[being a] victim of fraud". An online activation option was offered (like the actual Windows activation process), but was unavailable, requiring the user to call one of six international numbers to input a 6-digit code. While the malware claimed that this call would be free, it was routed through a rogue operator in a country with high international phone rates, who placed the call on hold, causing the user to incur large international long-distance charges.

In 2012, Symantec reported spread out of Eastern Europe of ransomware with a lock screen purporting to be law enforcement demanding payment for illegal activity.

In February 2013, a ransomware Trojan based on the Stamp.EK exploit kit surfaced; the malware was distributed via sites hosted on the project hosting services SourceForge and GitHub that claimed to offer "fake nude pics" of celebrities. In July 2013, an OS X-specific ransomware Trojan surfaced, which displays a web page that accuses the user of downloading pornography. Unlike its Windows-based counterparts, it does not block the entire computer, but simply exploits the behaviour of the web browser itself to frustrate attempts to close the page through normal means.

In July 2013, a 21-year-old man from Virginia, whose computer coincidentally did contain pornographic photographs of underage girls with whom he had conducted sexualized communications, turned himself in to police after receiving and being deceived by FBI MoneyPak Ransomware accusing him of possessing child pornography. An investigation discovered the incriminating files, and the man was charged with child sexual abuse and possession of child pornography.

=== Exfiltration (Leakware / Doxware) ===
The converse of ransomware is a cryptovirology attack invented by Adam L. Young that threatens to publish stolen information from the victim's computer system rather than deny the victim access to it. In a leakware attack, malware exfiltrates sensitive host data either to the attacker or alternatively, to remote instances of the malware, and the attacker threatens to publish the victim's data unless a ransom is paid. The attack was presented at West Point in 2003 and was summarized in the book Malicious Cryptography as follows, "The attack differs from the extortion attack in the following way. In the extortion attack, the victim is denied access to its own valuable information and has to pay to get it back, where in the attack that is presented here the victim retains access to the information but its disclosure is at the discretion of the computer virus". The attack is rooted in game theory and was originally dubbed "non-zero sum games and survivable malware". The attack can yield monetary gain in cases where the malware acquires access to information that may damage the victim user or organization, e.g., the reputational damage that could result from publishing proof that the attack itself was a success.

Common targets for exfiltration include:

- third party information stored by the primary victim (such as customer account information or health records);
- information proprietary to the victim (such as trade secrets and product information)
- embarrassing information (such as the victim's health information or information about the victim's personal past)

Exfiltration attacks are usually targeted, with a curated victim list, and often preliminary surveillance of the victim's systems to find potential data targets and weaknesses.

=== Mobile ransomware ===
With the increased popularity of ransomware on PC platforms, ransomware targeting mobile operating systems has also proliferated. Typically, mobile ransomware payloads are blockers, as there is little incentive to encrypt data since it can be easily restored via online synchronization. Mobile ransomware typically targets the Android platform, as it allows applications to be installed from third-party sources. The payload is typically distributed as an APK file installed by an unsuspecting user; it may attempt to display a blocking message over top of all other applications, while another used a form of clickjacking to cause the user to give it "device administrator" privileges to achieve deeper access to the system.

Different tactics have been used on iOS devices, such as exploiting iCloud accounts and using the Find My iPhone system to lock access to the device. On iOS 10.3, Apple patched a bug in the handling of JavaScript pop-up windows in Safari that had been exploited by ransomware websites. It recently has been shown that ransomware may also target ARM architectures like those that can be found in various Internet-of-Things (IoT) devices, such as Industrial IoT edge devices.

In August 2019 researchers demonstrated it is possible to infect DSLR cameras with ransomware. Digital cameras often use Picture Transfer Protocol (PTP) to transfer files. Researchers found that it was possible to exploit vulnerabilities in the protocol to infect target camera(s) with ransomware (or execute any arbitrary code). This attack was presented at the Defcon security conference in Las Vegas as a proof of concept attack (not as actual armed malware).

=== Progression of attacks ===
The first attacks were on random users, typically infected through email attachments sent by small groups of criminals, demanding a few hundred dollars in cryptocurrency to unlock files (typically a private individual's photographs and documents) that the ransomware had encrypted. As ransomware matured as a business, organised gangs entered the field, advertising on the dark Web for experts, and outsourcing functions. This led to improvement in the quality of ransomware and its success. Rather than random emails, the gangs stole credentials, found vulnerabilities in target networks, and improved the malware to avoid detection by anti-malware scanners. Ransoms demanded escalated into the much larger sums (millions) that an enterprise would pay to recover its data, rather than what an individual would pay for their documents (hundreds).

In 2016, a significant uptick in ransomware attacks on hospitals was noted. According to the 2017 Internet Security Threat Report from Symantec Corp, ransomware affected not only IT systems but also patient care, clinical operations, and billing. Online criminals may be motivated by the money available and sense of urgency within the healthcare system.

Ransomware is growing rapidly across the internet users but also for the IoT environment. The big problem is that millions of dollars are lost by some organizations and industries that have decided to pay, such as the Hollywood Presbyterian Medical Center and the MedStar Health.

According to Symantec 2019 ISTR report, for the first time since 2013, in 2018 there was an observed decrease in ransomware activity, with a drop of 20 percent. Before 2017, consumers were the preferred targets. But in 2017 this changed dramatically -- as criminals began shifting to enterprises. In 2018, this path accelerated with 81 percent infections which represented a 12 percent increase. The common distribution method today is based on email campaigns.

In late 2019 ransomware group Maze downloaded companies' sensitive files before locking them, and threatened to leak the data publicly if the ransom was not paid; in at least one case they did this. Many other gangs followed; "leak sites" were created on the dark web where stolen data could be accessed. Later attacks focused on the threat to leak data, without necessarily locking it—this negated the protection afforded victims by robust backup procedures. As of 2023 there is a risk of hostile governments using ransomware to conceal what is actually intelligence gathering.

The first reported death following a ransomware attack was at a German hospital in October 2020.

There was a significant increase in ransomware attacks during the 2020 COVID-19 pandemic. Evidence found that the targeted institutions of these attacks included government, finance, and healthcare. Researchers have contended that several different factors can explain the increase in attacks during this time. However, a major factor is that remote work, which became the norm for many industries in 2020, led to the surge in attacks because of the lack of security in comparison to traditional work environments.

Ransomware attacks are estimated to have led to payments totalling $1.1bn in 2019, $999m in 2020, and a record $1.25bn in 2023. This decreased to $813m in 2024, with a sharp drop in the second half of the year, according to research firm Chainalysis, attributed to victims refusing to pay, and action by law enforcement. However, Chainalysis said that the downward trend in payments was fragile, and ransomware attacks remained prolific. Chainalysis later raised its 2024 estimate to $892 million as further payments came to light, and tracked about $820 million in ransomware payments in 2025, a total it expected to reach roughly $900 million once more payments were attributed. A coordinated international operation in February 2024 took down gang LockBit, and gang BlackCat/ALPHV disappeared.

As of early 2025, the United Kingdom was considering banning schools, the NHS and local councils from making ransomware payments, requiring private companies to report proposed payouts, and requiring mandatory reporting of ransomware attacks.

== Notable software packages ==
=== Reveton ===
A Reveton payload, fraudulently claiming that the user must pay a fine to the Metropolitan Police Service

In 2012, a major ransomware Trojan known as Reveton began to spread. Based on the Citadel Trojan (which, itself, is based on the Zeus Trojan), its payload displays a warning purportedly from a law enforcement agency claiming that the computer has been used for illegal activities, such as downloading unlicensed software or child pornography. Due to this behaviour, it is commonly referred to as the "Police Trojan". The warning informs the user that to unlock their system, they would have to pay a fine using a voucher from an anonymous prepaid cash service such as Ukash or paysafecard. To increase the illusion that the computer is being tracked by law enforcement, the screen also displays the computer's IP address, while some versions display footage from a victim's webcam to give the illusion that the user is being recorded.

Reveton initially began spreading in various European countries in early 2012. Variants were localized with templates branded with the logos of different law enforcement organizations based on the user's country; for example, variants used in the United Kingdom contained the branding of organizations such as the Metropolitan Police Service and the Police National E-Crime Unit. Another version contained the logo of the royalty collection society PRS for Music, which specifically accused the user of illegally downloading music. In a statement warning the public about the malware, the Metropolitan Police clarified that they would never lock a computer in such a way as part of an investigation.

In May 2012, Trend Micro threat researchers discovered templates for variations for the United States and Canada, suggesting that its authors may have been planning to target users in North America. By August 2012, a new variant of Reveton began to spread in the United States, claiming to require the payment of a $200 fine to the FBI using a MoneyPak card. In February 2013, a Russian citizen was arrested in Dubai by Spanish authorities for his connection to a crime ring that had been using Reveton; ten other individuals were arrested on money laundering charges. In August 2014, Avast Software reported that it had found new variants of Reveton that also distribute password-stealing malware as part of its payload.

=== CryptoLocker ===
Encrypting ransomware reappeared in September 2013 with a Trojan known as CryptoLocker, which generated a 2048-bit RSA key pair and uploaded in turn to a command-and-control server, and used to encrypt files using a whitelist of specific file extensions. The malware threatened to delete the private key if a payment of Bitcoin or a pre-paid cash voucher was not made within 3 days of the infection. Due to the extremely large key size it uses, analysts and those affected by the Trojan considered CryptoLocker extremely difficult to repair. Even after the deadline passed, the private key could still be obtained using an online tool, but the price would increase to 10 BTC—which cost approximately US$2300 as of November 2013.

CryptoLocker was isolated by the seizure of the Gameover ZeuS botnet as part of Operation Tovar, as officially announced by the U.S. Department of Justice on 2 June 2014. The Department of Justice also publicly issued an indictment against the Russian hacker Evgeniy Bogachev for his alleged involvement in the botnet. It was estimated that at least US$3 million was extorted with the malware before the shutdown.

=== CryptoLocker.F and TorrentLocker ===
In September 2014, a wave of ransomware Trojans surfaced that first targeted users in Australia, under the names CryptoWall and CryptoLocker (which is, as with CryptoLocker 2.0, unrelated to the original CryptoLocker). The Trojans spread via fraudulent e-mails claiming to be failed parcel delivery notices from Australia Post; to evade detection by automatic e-mail scanners that follow all links on a page to scan for malware, this variant was designed to require users to visit a web page and enter a CAPTCHA code before the payload is actually downloaded, preventing such automated processes from being able to scan the payload. Symantec determined that these new variants, which it identified as CryptoLocker.F, were again, unrelated to the original CryptoLocker due to differences in their operation. A notable victim of the Trojans was the Australian Broadcasting Corporation; live programming on its television news channel ABC News 24 was disrupted for half an hour and shifted to Melbourne studios due to a CryptoWall infection on computers at its Sydney studio.

Another Trojan in this wave, TorrentLocker, initially contained a design flaw comparable to CryptoDefense; it used the same keystream for every infected computer, making the encryption trivial to overcome. However, this flaw was later fixed. By late-November 2014, it was estimated that over 9,000 users had been infected by TorrentLocker in Australia alone, trailing only Turkey with 11,700 infections.

=== CryptoWall ===
Another major ransomware Trojan targeting Windows, CryptoWall, first appeared in 2014. One strain of CryptoWall was distributed as part of a malvertising campaign on the Zedo ad network in late-September 2014 that targeted several major websites; the ads redirected to rogue websites that used browser plugin exploits to download the payload. A Barracuda Networks researcher also noted that the payload was signed with a digital signature in an effort to appear trustworthy to security software. CryptoWall 3.0 used a payload written in JavaScript as part of an email attachment, which downloads executables disguised as JPG images. To further evade detection, the malware creates new instances of explorer.exe and svchost.exe to communicate with its servers. When encrypting files, the malware also deletes volume shadow copies and installs spyware that steals passwords and Bitcoin wallets.

The FBI reported in June 2015 that nearly 1,000 victims had contacted the bureau's Internet Crime Complaint Center to report CryptoWall infections, and estimated losses of at least $18 million.

The most recent version, CryptoWall 4.0, enhanced its code to avoid antivirus detection, and encrypts not only the data in files but also the file names.

=== Fusob ===
Fusob is a major family of mobile ransomware. Between April 2015 and March 2016, about 56 percent of accounted mobile ransomware was Fusob.

Like most other pieces of ransomware, it employs scare tactics to extort a hefty sum from the user. The app acts as if it were a notice from the authorities, demanding the victim to pay a fine from $100 to $200 USD or otherwise face a fictitious criminal charge. Fusob requests iTunes gift cards for payment, unlike most cryptocurrency-centric ransomware.

In order to infect devices, Fusob masquerades as a pornographic video player. When it is installed, it first checks the device's system language. If the language is Russian or Eastern-European, Fusob remains dormant. Otherwise, it locks the device and demands ransom. About 40% of victims are in Germany, while the United Kingdom encompasses 14.5% of victims and the US encompasses 11.4%. Fusob and Small (another family of ransomware) represented over 93% of mobile ransomware between 2015 and 2016.

=== WannaCry ===
In May 2017, the WannaCry ransomware attack spread through the Internet, using an exploit vector named EternalBlue, which was allegedly leaked from the U.S. National Security Agency. The ransomware attack, unprecedented in scale, infected more than 230,000 computers in over 150 countries, using 20 different languages to demand money from users using Bitcoin cryptocurrency. WannaCry demanded US$300 per computer. The attack affected Telefónica and several other large companies in Spain, as well as parts of the British National Health Service (NHS), where at least 16 hospitals had to turn away patients or cancel scheduled operations, FedEx, Deutsche Bahn, Honda, Renault, as well as the Russian Interior Ministry and Russian telecom MegaFon. The attackers gave their victims a 7-day deadline from the day their computers got infected, after which the encrypted files would be deleted.

=== Petya ===
Petya was first discovered in March 2016; unlike other forms of encrypting ransomware, the malware aimed to infect the master boot record, installing a payload which encrypts the file tables of the NTFS file system the next time that the infected system boots, blocking the system from booting into Windows at all until the ransom is paid. Check Point reported that despite what it believed to be an innovative evolution in ransomware design, it had resulted in relatively-fewer infections than other ransomware active around the same time frame.

On 27 June 2017, a heavily modified version of Petya was used for a global cyberattack primarily targeting Ukraine (but affecting many countries). This version had been modified to propagate using the same EternalBlue exploit that was used by WannaCry. Due to another design change, it is also unable to actually unlock a system after the ransom is paid; this led to security analysts speculating that the attack was not meant to generate illicit profit, but to simply cause disruption.

=== Bad Rabbit ===
On 24 October 2017, some users in Russia and Ukraine reported a new ransomware attack, named "Bad Rabbit", which follows a similar pattern to WannaCry and Petya by encrypting the user's file tables and then demanding a Bitcoin payment to decrypt them. ESET believed the ransomware to have been distributed by a bogus update to Adobe Flash software. Among agencies that were affected by the ransomware were: Interfax, Odesa International Airport, Kyiv Metro, and the Ministry of Infrastructure of Ukraine. As it used corporate network structures to spread, the ransomware was also discovered in other countries, including Turkey, Germany, Poland, Japan, South Korea, and the United States. Experts believed the ransomware attack was tied to the Petya attack in Ukraine (especially because Bad Rabbit's code has many overlapping and analogical elements to the code of Petya/NotPetya, appending to CrowdStrike Bad Rabbit and NotPetya's dynamic link library (DLL) share 67 percent of the same code) though the only identity to the culprits are the names of characters from the Game of Thrones series embedded within the code.

Security experts found that the ransomware did not use the EternalBlue exploit to spread, and a simple method to inoculate an unaffected machine running older Windows versions was found by 24 October 2017. Further, the sites that had been used to spread the bogus Flash updating have gone offline or removed the problematic files within a few days of its discovery, effectively killing off the spread of Bad Rabbit.

=== SamSam ===
In 2016, a new strain of ransomware emerged that was targeting JBoss servers. This strain, named "SamSam", was found to bypass the process of phishing or illicit downloads in favor of exploiting vulnerabilities on weak servers. The malware uses a Remote Desktop Protocol brute-force attack to guess weak passwords until one is broken. The virus has been behind attacks on government and healthcare targets, with notable hacks occurring against the town of Farmington, New Mexico, the Colorado Department of Transportation, Davidson County, North Carolina, and most recently, a ransomware attack on the infrastructure of Atlanta.

Mohammad Mehdi Shah Mansouri (born in Qom, Iran in 1991) and Faramarz Shahi Savandi (born in Shiraz, Iran, in 1984) are wanted by the FBI for allegedly launching SamSam ransomware. The two have allegedly made $6 million from extortion and caused over $30 million in damages using the malware.

=== DarkSide ===
On May 7, 2021, a cyberattack was executed on the US Colonial Pipeline. The Federal Bureau of Investigation identified DarkSide as the perpetrator of the Colonial Pipeline ransomware attack, perpetrated by malicious code, that led to a voluntary shutdown of the main pipeline supplying 45% of fuel to the East Coast of the United States. The attack was described as the worst cyberattack to date on the U.S. critical infrastructure. DarkSide successfully extorted about 75 Bitcoin (almost US$5 million) from Colonial Pipeline. U.S. officials are investigating whether the attack was purely criminal or took place with the involvement of the Russian government or another state sponsor. Following the attack, DarkSide posted a statement claiming that "We are apolitical, we do not participate in geopolitics...Our goal is to make money and not creating problems for society."

In May 2021, the FBI and Cybersecurity and Infrastructure Security Agency (CISA) issued a joint alert urging the owners and operators of critical infrastructure to take certain steps to reduce their vulnerability to DarkSide ransomware and ransomware in general.

=== Syskey ===
Syskey is a utility that was included with Windows NT-based operating systems to encrypt the user account database, optionally with a password. The tool has sometimes been effectively used as ransomware during technical support scams—where a caller with remote access to the computer may use the tool to lock the user out of their computer with a password known only to them. Syskey was removed from later versions of Windows 10 and Windows Server in 2017, due to being obsolete and "known to be used by hackers as part of ransomware scams".

=== Ransomware-as-a-service ===
Ransomware-as-a-service (RaaS) became a notable method after the Russia-based or Russian-speaking group REvil staged operations against several targets, including the Brazil-based JBS S.A. in May 2021, and the US-based Kaseya Limited in July 2021. After a July 9, 2021 phone call between United States president Joe Biden and Russian president Vladimir Putin, Biden told the press, "I made it very clear to him that the United States expects when a ransomware operation is coming from his soil even though it's not sponsored by the state, we expect them to act if we give them enough information to act on who that is." Biden later added that the United States would take the group's servers down if Putin did not. Four days later, REvil websites and other infrastructure vanished from the internet.

== Mitigation ==
If an attack is suspected or detected in its early stages, it takes some time for encryption to take place; immediate removal of the malware (a relatively simple process) before it has completed would stop further damage to data, without salvaging any already lost.

Security experts have suggested precautionary measures for dealing with ransomware. Using software or other security policies to block known payloads from launching will help to prevent infection, but will not protect against all attacks. As such, having a proper backup solution is a critical component to defending against ransomware. Note that, because many ransomware attackers will not only encrypt the victim's live machine but it will also attempt to delete any hot backups stored locally or on accessible over the network on a NAS, it is also critical to maintain "offline" backups of data stored in locations inaccessible from any potentially infected computer, such as external storage drives or devices that do not have any access to any network (including the Internet), prevents them from being accessed by the ransomware. Moreover, if using a NAS or Cloud storage, then the computer should have append-only permission to the destination storage, such that it cannot delete or overwrite previous backups. According to comodo, applying two Attack Surface Reduction on OS/Kernel provides a materially-reduced attack surface which results in a heightened security posture.

Installing security updates issued by software vendors can mitigate the vulnerabilities leveraged by certain strains to propagate. Other measures include cyber hygiene − exercising caution when opening e-mail attachments and links, network segmentation, and keeping critical computers isolated from networks. Furthermore, to mitigate the spread of ransomware measures of infection control can be applied. Such may include disconnecting infected machines from all networks, educational programs, effective communication channels, malware surveillance and ways of collective participation

In August 2021, the Cybersecurity and Infrastructure Security Agency (CISA) released a report that provided guidance for how to mitigate ransomware attacks. This was due to a significant jump in recent attacks related to ransomware. These attacks included aggression against a US pipeline company and a software company, which impacted the downstream customers of MSPs.

Write Once Read Many (WORM) storage, such as many optical disc formats are virtually immune to ransomware since its contents cannot be changed or deleted. However data cannot be deleted in any way making it impractical for many storage due to privacy laws and other content laws, the only way is to copy it to a new WORM disk minus the unwanted files, then destroy the original copy.

=== Ransomware in health care ===
The healthcare sector has been disproportionately targeted by ransomware attacks, prompting regulatory responses aimed at strengthening requirements for organizations handling sensitive patient data. In the United States, the 2024 Change Healthcare cyberattack disrupted healthcare payment processing nationwide and affected approximately 100 million individuals, highlighting vulnerabilities in healthcare infrastructure.

=== File system defenses against ransomware ===
A number of file systems keep snapshots of the data they hold, which can be used to recover the contents of files from a time prior to the ransomware attack in the event the ransomware does not disable it.

- On Windows, the Volume shadow copy (VSS) is often used to store backups of data; ransomware often targets these snapshots to prevent recovery and therefore it is often advisable to disable user access to the user tool VSSadmin.exe to reduce the risk that ransomware can disable or delete past copies.
- On Windows 10, users can add specific directories or files to Controlled Folder Access in Windows Defender to protect them from ransomware. It is advised to add backup and other important directories to Controlled Folder Access.
- Unless malware gains root on the ZFS host system in deploying an attack coded to issue ZFS administrative commands, file servers running ZFS are broadly immune to ransomware, because ZFS is capable of snapshotting even a large file system many times an hour, and these snapshots are immutable (read only) and easily rolled back or files recovered in the event of data corruption. In general, only an administrator can delete (but cannot modify) snapshots.

=== File decryption and recovery ===
There are a number of tools intended specifically to decrypt files locked by ransomware, although successful recovery may not be possible. If the same encryption key is used for all files, decryption tools use files for which there are both uncorrupted backups and encrypted copies (a known-plaintext attack in the jargon of cryptanalysis; this attack only works when the cipher the attacker used was weak to begin with, being vulnerable to known-plaintext attack); recovery of the key, if it is possible, may take several days. Free ransomware decryption tools can help decrypt files encrypted by the following forms of ransomware: AES_NI, Alcatraz Locker, Apocalypse, BadBlock, Bart, BTCWare, Crypt888, CryptoMix, CrySiS, EncrypTile, FindZip, Globe, Hidden Tear, Jigsaw, LambdaLocker, Legion, NoobCrypt, Stampado, SZFLocker, TeslaCrypt, XData. Ransomware encryption that has been cracked by security researchers is typically abandoned for criminal purposes; thus in practice most attacks cannot be reverted by breaking encryption.

The No More Ransom Project is an initiative by the Netherlands' police's National High Tech Crime Unit, Europol's European Cybercrime Centre, Kaspersky Lab and McAfee to help ransomware victims recover their data without paying a ransom. They offer a free CryptoSheriff tool to analyze encrypted files and search for decryption tools.

In addition, old copies of files may exist on the disk, which has been previously deleted. In some cases, these deleted versions may still be recoverable using software designed for that purpose.

A 2019 ProPublica investigation found the cybersecurity firms Proven Data Recovery and Monstercloud, which advertised ransom-free decryption services, would typically simply pay the ransom and charge the victim a higher price. SamSam hackers dealt with Proven Data so frequently that they would recommend the company to victims having technical difficulties making payment. Other companies like Coveware were more transparent in offering the service of paying the hackers and patching insecure systems. Many American victims found the ransom amount was too low to meet the United States Department of Justice threshold for federal involvement, but that local police lacked the technical capabilities to help and were often victims themselves.

== Criminal arrests and convictions ==
=== Reveton ===
A British student, Zain Qaiser was sentenced in 2019 to over 6 years in prison for creating and leading a ransomware enterprise. Qaiser’s group used the Angler Exploit Kit to deliver Reveton Ransomware, in conjunction with the Russian LURK threat actor’s group. Qaiser’s group earned millions of dollars from this scheme. Some of the earnings were laundered through a co-conspirator in the U.S., Raymond Odigie Uadiale, who also received a 18 month prison sentence. Uadiale acted as a money launderer.

=== NetWalker ===
The U.S. Department of Justice in January 2021, announced a Joint International law enforcement operation to disrupt the NetWalker ransomware scheme. The operation also raised charges against Sebastien Vachon-Desjardins for operating the scheme out of Canada. Vachon-Desjardins was charged with various fraudulent activities and allegedly amassed over $27.6 million from his illegal endeavors. At the time of his arrest, law enforcement also seized over $454,000 in cryptocurrency.

=== LockBit ===
The U.S. and the U.K. in February 2024, announced a similar international effort to disrupt the LockBit ransomware scheme. The U.S. also charged Artur Sungatov and Ivan Kondratyev with targeting the U.S. semiconductor and related industries. Sungatov was charged with money laundering.

=== AI Generated ===
In May 2024, The Metropolitan Police Department in Tokyo arrested 25-year-old Ryuki Hayashi for reportedly creating ransomware using artificial intelligence (AI). According to The Asahi Shimbun, Hayashi stated "I thought generative AI can do anything” and “I wanted to create ransomware”.

== Legal aspects ==
The publication of proof-of-concept attack code is common among academic researchers and vulnerability researchers. It teaches the nature of the threat, conveys the gravity of the issues, and enables countermeasures to be devised and put into place. However, lawmakers with the support of law-enforcement bodies are contemplating making the creation of ransomware illegal. In the state of Maryland, the original draft of HB 340 made it a felony to create ransomware, punishable by up to 10 years in prison. A minor in Japan was arrested for creating and distributing ransomware code.

Australia requires ransomware victims to report their payments to the Australian Signals Directorate in some cases.

== See also ==
- Colonial Pipeline ransomware attack – Ransomware attack on American oil pipeline system
- BlueKeep (security vulnerability) – Windows security hole
- Brinkmanship – Political and military tactic
- Hitler-Ransomware – Form of ransomware
- Jigsaw (ransomware) – Encrypting ransomware created in 2016
- Append-only – Property of computer data storage
- Riskware – Software that poses a risk to a host computer
- Ryuk (ransomware) – Type of ransomware
- Reliability engineering – Sub-discipline of systems engineering that emphasizes dependability
- Air gap (networking) – Network security measure
- Data redundancy – Surplus computer data for error correction
- Fault tolerance – Resilience of systems to component failures or errors
- Reliability (computer networking) – Protocol acknowledgement capability
- Unidirectional network – Network device that permits data flow in only one direction
- fault-tolerant computer system – Resilience of systems to component failures or errors
- Byzantine fault – Fault in a computer system that presents different symptoms to different observers
- Quantum Byzantine agreement – Quantum version of the Byzantine agreement protocol
- Two Generals' Problem – Thought experiment
- The Ransomware Hunting Team – 2022 nonfiction book by Renee Dudley and Daniel Golden
- Initial access broker – Hacker selling access to hacked computers
