= Jigsaw Puzzle =

Jigsaw Puzzle may refer to:

- Jigsaw puzzle, a tiling puzzle
- "Jigsaw Puzzle" (song), by the Rolling Stones, 1968
- Jigsawpuzzle, video games for the DC and Wii in the Puzzle Series
