= Borland, Pleasants County, West Virginia =

Unincorporated community in West Virginia, United States

Borland
- Unincorporated community
- Location within the state of West Virginia Borland (the United States)
- Coordinates: 39°17′52″N 81°16′57″W
- Country: United States
- State: West Virginia
- County: Pleasants
- Elevation: 686 ft (209 m)
- Time zone: UTC-5 (Eastern (EST))
  - Summer (DST): UTC-4 (EDT)
- GNIS ID: 1550423

Borland is an unincorporated community in Pleasants County, West Virginia, United States.
