= Albert Borland =

South African cricketer

Personal information
- Full name: Albert Francis Borland
- Born: 13 December 1901; Durban, Colony of Natal
- Died: 19 July 1961 (aged 59); Durban, Natal, South Africa
- Batting: Left-handed
- Bowling: Left-arm

Domestic team information
- Years: Team
- 1920–21 to 1932–33: Natal

Career statistics
Competition	First-class
Matches	34
Runs scored	751
Batting average	20.29
100s/50s	0/4
Top score	72
Balls bowled	6923
Wickets	104
Bowling average	23.50
5 wickets in innings	3
10 wickets in match	0
Best bowling	6/34
Catches/stumpings	18/–
- Source: Cricinfo, 19 April 2020

Albert Francis Borland (13 December 1901 – 19 July 1961) was a South African cricketer who played first-class cricket for Natal from 1921 to 1933.

Borland was a left-arm bowler whose lower-order batting improved as his career progressed. His highest first-class score was 72 in Natal's victory over Griqualand West in the Currie Cup in 1931–32, when he also took 5 for 51 and 4 for 112. His best bowling figures were 6 for 34 when Natal dismissed Orange Free State in the 1925–26 Currie Cup to win by 235 runs.

Borland's most notable feat was in becoming the first person to take four wickets in consecutive deliveries in South African first-class cricket. In the Currie Cup match against Griqualand West in 1926–27, Griqualand West were 120 for 6 in their first innings when he came on to bowl for the first time in the innings. After an uneventful first delivery, he took wickets with his next four to finish the innings, ending with figures of 0.5–0–0–4. Borland was the 16th first-class player to take four wickets in consecutive deliveries, and as of late 2024 the feat has been achieved only 47 times.
