= S'More (dating app) =

S'More (app)
- Original authors: Adam Cohen-Aslatei (Founder, CEO)
- Developer: S'More Date
- Release: January 1, 2020
- Stable release: 1.0.17 / May 4, 2020
- Operating system: iOS
- Platform: iOS
- Available in: English
- Type: Online dating application
- License: Freeware
- Website: www.smoredate.com (defunct)

S'More was a dating app developed by Something More Inc. It was considered to be an anti-superficial dating app. Profile photos were revealed over time only after a person has indicated interested in a person via interacting with their profile.

== Formation ==
In 2019, S'More was launched by entrepreneur Adam Cohen-Aslatei, the former managing director of Chappy, Bumble's gay dating app. The company headquartered in New York City. A beta version of S'More was launched in Boston in January 2020.

S'More has raised capital totaling $3.2 million across two rounds. They raised $1.1 million in a pre-seed funding round led by Benson Oak Ventures. Several venture investors including Dmitry Volkov, SideCar Angels, Joshua Black (Principal, Apollo Global Management) participated in the round. They subsequently raised a $2.1 million in a seed funding round led by Benson Oak Ventures. Several venture investors including Mark Pincus and Gaingels, among others participated in the round.

== Features ==
S'More uses a matching algorithm to recommend five potential matches to a user every day. Notably, S'More uses facial recognition technology to prevent catfishing and underage use. According to cnet.com, "S'More blurs out profile photos, forcing daters to focus first on the interests and attributes listed, which lead to more meaningful interactions among daters". American fashion publisher V magazine reported that, the S'More app algorithm, encourages the development of deep relationships amid pandemic.

In April 2020, S'More partnered with HopeLine to raise money to fight the mental health crisis of COVID-19. For each new chat started on the platform, S'More donates $1 to HopeLine.

== Acquisition ==
In 2023, S’More, was acquired by matchmaking service provider Tawkify. S’More aimed to shift the focus from appearances to personality and compatibility. With the acquisition, S’More discontinued its app operations, and its founder, Adam Cohen-Aslatei, joined Tawkify to lead the development of its first mobile app.

While specific financial terms of the deal were not disclosed, S’More had previously raised $3.2 million in seed funding. The acquisition aligns with Tawkify’s philosophy of promoting deeper, non-superficial matchmaking.

This move represents a shift in the dating industry, reflecting a growing demand for alternatives to traditional dating apps, with a focus on human-driven matchmaking and relationship wellness.
