= John Borland (Scottish footballer) =

Scottish footballer

Personal information
- Full name: John Borland
- Date of birth: 25 July 1951 (age 75)
- Place of birth: Shettleston, Scotland
- Position: Inside forward

Senior career*
Years	Team	Apps	(Gls)
–1971	Bishopton Thistle		
1971–1974	Queen's Park	53	(9)

International career
1973–1974	Scotland Amateurs	5	(0)
- * Club domestic league appearances and goals

John Borland (born 25 July 1951) is a Scottish retired amateur football inside forward who played in the Scottish League for Queen's Park. He was capped by Scotland at amateur level.
