= John Replogle =

American businessman

- Education: Dartmouth College; Harvard Business School
- Occupations: President & CEO of Seventh Generation Inc.
- Spouse: Kristin Replogle
- Children: 4 daughters
- Website: 1bv.co

John Replogle is a Founding Partner of One Better Ventures and the former CEO of Seventh Generation Inc., a U.S.-based, consumer product company.

== Life and career ==
Replogle earned an A.B. in government from Dartmouth College in 1988. While a student at Dartmouth, he served as student body president and was a member of Bones Gate fraternity. After graduating from Dartmouth, Replogle spent five years working at the Boston Consulting Group before enrolling at Harvard Business School, where he graduated with distinction two years later.

After Harvard, he was hired by Guinness Brewery as head of strategy for Guinness Americas and Caribbean. He remained with the company (a subsidiary of Diageo) for eight years, eventually becoming President of Guinness Bass Import Co. in the U.S. and Guinness U.K. Replogle was previously the general manager for Unilever's North American skin care division and President and CEO of Burt's Bees before joining Seventh Generation Inc. as CEO and President on February 9, 2011.

He is a member of the Harvard Business School Investment Society.
