= Seventh Generation Inc. =

American eco-friendly household products company

Seventh Generation, Inc.
- Type: Subsidiary
- Industry: Natural household products
- Founded: 1988; 38 years ago
- Founders: Jeffrey Hollender; Alan Newman
- Headquarters: Burlington, Vermont, U.S.
- Key people: Alison Whritenour, CEO and President; Jeffrey Hollender, Co-Founder; Alan Newman, Co-Founder
- Products: Laundry Detergent; Dish Soap; Personal care Baby Diapers; Paper Products
- Revenue: $200 million (2015)
- Owner: Unilever (2016−present)
- Number of employees: 170 (2015)
- Website: seventhgeneration.com

Seventh Generation, Inc. is an American company selling eco-friendly cleaning, paper, and personal care products. Established in 1988, the Burlington, Vermont-based company distributes products to natural food stores, supermarkets, mass merchants, and online retailers. In 2016, Anglo-Dutch consumer goods company Unilever acquired Seventh Generation for an estimated $700 million.

Seventh Generation focuses its marketing and product development on sustainability and the conservation of natural resources. The company uses recycled and post-consumer materials in its packaging, as well as biodegradable, plant-based phosphate-free and chlorine-free ingredients in its products.

The company attributes the name "Seventh Generation" to the "Great Law of the Iroquois". Per the company, the document states, "In our every deliberation, we must consider the impact of our decisions on the next seven generations."

== History ==
=== 1988–1990 ===
In 1988, Alan Newman acquired Renew America, a mail-order catalog that sells energy-, water- and resource-saving products. After giving the catalog a new look, an enhanced mix of products, and a new name, Seventh Generation, Newman embarked on a campaign to raise funding for the venture. The next year, entrepreneur and author of How to Make the World a Better Place, Jeffrey Hollender, joined Newman and helped secure much-needed capital, and a mention in the New York Times increased orders seven-fold within a year.

=== 1991–2000 ===
Newman left Seventh Generation in 1992 to start Magic Hat Brewing Company. Seventh Generation went public the next year on 8 November, raising $7 million.

In 1994, Seventh Generation entered the mass retail market with three products: dishwasher detergent, non-chlorine bleach, and liquid laundry detergent. And in 1995, the company's mail-order catalog business sold to Gaiam, Inc. and Seventh Generation began focusing solely on its wholesale products business.

=== 2001–2021 ===
Hollender stepped aside as CEO in 2009, and former PepsiCo division president Chuck Maniscalco joined the company and took over the role. John Replogle took over as president and CEO in February 2011. Joey Bergstein was named CEO in 2017 after Replogle became chairman of the Seventh Generation Social Mission Board.

In September 2016, Unilever Plc. purchased Seventh Generation for an estimated $700 million. In July 2021, Alison Whritenour became Seventh Generation's first female CEO.

=== 2022–2026 ===
Seventh Generation was questioned for its funding of a curriculum by four groups recognized as Abenaki tribes by Vermont. They did not respond to inquiries by Vermont Public or the Odanak and Wôlinak First Nations.

== Awards ==
Seventh Generation has received multiple awards.

- 2004 Corporate Stewardship Award for Small Business from the United States Chamber of Commerce Center for Corporate Citizenship. Award recipients were selected based on "a demonstration of ethical leadership and corporate stewardship, making a difference in their communities, and contributions to the advancement of important economic and social goals."
- Fastest Growing Company in Vermont - 5x5x5 Award from Vermont Business Magazine and KeyBank for "achievements in keeping true to its mission to create healthy products that preserve the environment, every year since 2004."
- Ceres-ACCA North American Awards for Sustainability Reporting - Best Small or Medium Enterprise Corporate Responsibility Report, April 2006 - the international competition was sponsored by Ceres (organization), a national network of investment funds, environmental organizations and other public interest groups working to advance environmental stewardship on the part of businesses, in partnership with the Association of Chartered Certified Accountants, and CoVeris, an independent corporate verification firm. Ceres called Seventh Generation's report "a pioneering effort in transparency for a privately owned company."
- In 2007, Seventh Generation was named the second fastest growing company in Vermont over the past ten years.
- Fast Company Social Capitalist Award 2007 – Fast Company magazine and Monitor Group.
- The Microsoft Excellence in Environmental Sustainability Award 2008 - Seventh Generation was recognized as a customer who is "using their business management system in an innovative way to track their initiatives around becoming more environmentally sustainable."
- In 2009, the IT department at Seventh Generation was named number eight in Computerworld's "Top Green-IT Organizations."
- In 2018, Seventh Generation was recognized as one of "the 50 most sustainable companies in the world" at the SEAL Business Sustainability Awards.
