= Billy Borland =

Scottish footballer

Personal information
- Full name: William Barr Borland
- Date of birth: 21 August 1888
- Place of birth: Darvel, Scotland
- Date of death: 25 September 1915 (aged 27)
- Place of death: Loos-en-Gohelle, France
- Position: Centre half

Senior career*
Years	Team	Apps	(Gls)
–1910	Darvel		
1910–1912	Fulham	3	(0)
- Galston
- Dumfries
- * Club domestic league appearances and goals

William Barr Borland (21 August 1888 – 25 September 1915) was a Scottish professional footballer who played as a centre half in the Football League for Fulham.

== Personal life ==
Borland enlisted in the British Army in October 1914, during the First World War. He served as a private in the Queen's Own Cameron Highlanders and was killed on the opening day of the Battle of Loos on 25 September 1915. He is commemorated on the Loos Memorial.

== Career statistics ==
Appearances and goals by club, season and competition
Club	Season	League			National Cup		Total	
Club	Season	Division	Apps	Goals	Apps	Goals	Apps	Goals
Fulham	1910–11	First Division	3	0	0	0	3	0
Career total			3	0	0	0	3	0
