= Borland C =

Borland C may refer to:

- Borland C++, a C++ compiler which followed and replaced Borland C
- Borland C, a 1990s C computer programming language compiler from Borland

== See also ==
- Turbo C, the predecessor of Borland C proper
