= C. H. Jaeger =

British military band leader (1913–1970)

Lieutenant Colonel Cecil Harry "Jiggs" Jaeger, OBE (29 April 1913 – 27 September 1970) was a British military band leader.

Jaeger was born in Elham, Kent, the son of a German father, Heinrich Jaeger, and English mother, Mina Pickering. He joined the King's Own Yorkshire Light Infantry at the age of 14. During World War II, he served in Italy, Greece and Austria, as the bandmaster of the 4th Hussars.

He appeared as a castaway on the BBC Radio programme Desert Island Discs on 18 November 1968. At that time he was Senior Director of Music in the Brigade of Guards, a post he had held since 1949.

He was an Officer of the Order of the British Empire (OBE).

He died in Richmond upon Thames, aged 57.

== Bibliography ==
- Dean, Colin (April 2013). Jiggs - A Biography of Lieutenant Colonel C H Jaeger OBE. Parapress. ISBN 978-1-898594-89-5.
