= Grove Collaborative =

American e-commerce company

- Type: Public
- Traded as: Nasdaq: GROV (Class A)
- Industry: E-commerce
- Founded: 2012; 14 years ago
- Founder: Stuart Landesberg, Chris Clark & Jordan Savage
- Headquarters: San Francisco, U.S.
- Area served: U.S.
- Key people: Jeff Yurcisin (chief executive officer)
- Revenue: US$259.3 million (2023)
- Operating income: US$−35.3 million (2023)
- Net income: US$−43.2 million (2023)
- Total assets: US$150.7 million (2023)
- Total equity: US$8.1 million (2023)
- Number of employees: 408
- Website: www.grove.co

Grove Collaborative is a benefit corporation headquartered in San Francisco, with an additional office in Portland, Maine. The company makes and sells its own environmentally friendly home and personal care products under its Grove Co. brand, as well as products from other companies.

== History ==
The company was founded in 2012 under the name ePantry by Stuart Landesberg, Chris Clark, and Jordan Savage. In 2016, it was rebranded as Grove.

In 2021 the company hired former Amazon executive Jennie Perry to serve as its chief marketing officer.

In April 2021, Grove began a brick-and-mortar partnership with nationwide retailer Target Corporation, which carries some of its products.

At the end of 2021, Grove raised $436 million in capital. In association with the December 2021 merger, $87 million was raised in a private investment in public equity. The Virgin Group SPAC trust provided an additional $348 million.

In December 2021, Grove Collaborative merged with a special-purpose acquisition company backed by Sir Richard Branson’s Virgin Group. Unilever PLC’s CEO, Paul Polman, was named as a partner in the venture and CEO Landesberg continued to lead Grove. The merger included taking the company public in June 2022, with a valuation of $1.5 billion. The combined company is listed under “GROV” on the New York Stock Exchange. The company laid off 17% of its workforce soon after the Virgin SPAC merger, to cut operating costs.

In early 2022, Grove Collaborative named Sergio Cervantes as its new CFO, after he spent 18 years with Unilever and four years with Gillette. In February 2022, former Burt's Bees executive John Replogle was appointed chairman of Grove Collaborative’s board of directors.

In April 2022, actress and entrepreneur Drew Barrymore became an investor in Grove Collaborative. She is the company’s first global brand and sustainability advocate.

In July 2022, retailers Kohl's, Meijer and Giant Eagle began carrying products from Grove Co.’s cleaning line. However, Q1 2022 revenue declined by 11% compared to Q1 2021. Grove Collaborative was chosen by Fast Company as one of the most innovative companies in 2022.

In August 2023, Jeff Yurcisin became the new Chief Executive Officer of Grove Collaborative. Landesberg transitioned from CEO to Executive Chairman of the Board of Directors, with Replogle becoming Lead Independent Director of the board.
