= Jig (disambiguation) =

A jig is a type of folk dance.

Jig or JIG may also refer to:

== Manufacturing ==
- Jig (tool), a device/frame used to control position or motion
- Jigs, various methods of gravity separation in a coal preparation plant

== Sports ==
- Jig, a fishing lure used in the jigging method of fishing (angling)
- "Jig", a nickname of Scottish footballer Lee McCulloch (born 1978)
- Jig, an unwanted anxious/restless on the spot trotting motion of a horse

== Entertainment ==
- Jig (film), a 2011 British documentary
- Jigs (band), a Swedish band
- Jig, a variant of the children's card game snip snap snorem
- Jay Is Games (J.I.G.), a game review website
- Jig, the goblin protagonist of several fantasy novels by Jim C. Hines
- Jig!, a strategy game for the Newton MessagePad published by Dubl-Click Software in 1991

== Slang ==
- Jig or Jigging, a verb for the act of truancy
- The Jig is up. Meaning a dishonest action that has been uncovered and will not be continued

== Other uses ==
- Gigue (French), or jig in English, a fast dance movement from the Baroque Suite
- George Cram Cook or Jig Cook (1873–1924), American theatre producer, director, playwright, novelist and poet
- Hurricane Jig (1951), in the Atlantic Ocean
- Jig, one of the sectors of Gold Beach during the World War II Normandy landings
- Jig, the phonetic for the letter J in the Joint Army/Navy Phonetic Alphabet
- jig, ISO 639-3 code for the Jingulu language of Australia

== See also ==
- The jig is up (disambiguation)
- Jig (theatre), 'dramatic' or 'farce' jig, a short, comic afterpiece in the playhouses of 16th and 17th century England
- James D. Ramage (1916–2012), American naval aviator and rear admiral nicknamed "Jig Dog"
