= Frank Borland =

Legion of Honor recipient (1925–2013)

Edward Franklin Grant Borland III (1925–2013) received the French Legion of Honor in 2005 for his saving of the French town of Dieppe, Seine-Maritime from a planned Allied Command air raid.

== Life ==
Borland was born March 31, 1925.

Borland, more commonly known as "Jiggs" by his family and friends, was born of Canadian parents in Reading, Pennsylvania, and emigrated to Canada with his parents at the age of 10.

He volunteered for the Canadian army at the age of 17. From here he would attend jump school in Manitoba but did not finish due to an injury. From here he moved onto tanker school in Borden, Ontario. Once he had completed this portion of his training he was assigned to 14th Canadian Hussars. Once in England, a number of the armored units were asked to assign a number of its members to a new unit known as the 8th Reconnaissance Squadron, better known as the Canadian 8th Recce. Jiggs' role within the unit was to be a main gunner, radio operator and secondary driver.

== Heroism ==
In a letter from French President Jacques Chirac in 2005, it was stated that he has been chosen to receive the "Legion of Honor". The honor has been bestowed upon Mr. Borland for his saving of the French town of Dieppe, Seine-Maritime from a planned Allied Command air raid. The 8th Recce was made aware, by the French resistance, that the German army had left the town overnight. The Germans had fought with the 2nd Canadian Division earlier in the war and didn't fare well and had no interest in doing it again. Upon learning that there were no Germans in the town Jiggs radioed to headquarters with the news. The response was to go and verify this because the bombing mission had been planned for a long time and wasn't about to be called off without concrete evidence.

The 8th Recce set out to verify the claim. Only six vehicles in the unit had radios. Due to the terrain and limitations of the radios the communication link with headquarters was lost every 8 to 10 miles (13 to 16 km). At this point they would leave a vehicle and a few men to re-establish the link. This tactic is never done as there is always the possibility of attack from an enemy force. The 8th Recce didn't have a smooth trip as they encountered small enemy ambushes and a retreating anti-aircraft unit. All of which put up a limited fight. Upon reaching a hill overlooking the town of Dieppe, with only one armored car and a Bren Gun Carrier, Jiggs and his crew of eight others were approached by the mayor and members of the French Resistance. They told them that there was only one German machine gun nest left in the town and pointed it out. As Jiggs lined up on the window with his main gun, a white flag emerged indicating surrender. The French police then arrested the Germans. Jiggs radioed back to headquarters the following message: "Francis is alive and well and will be expecting his friends for dinner". This meant that the town was indeed free of the enemy and that the rest of the 2nd Canadian Division could move up to this point. At this point, the Allied bombers were already in the air and less than 30 minutes from the target. The bombers were then rerouted to another target.

When interviewed by local and national news media, he had commented that he does not consider himself a hero. Borland was quoted as saying, "There was no heroism in it; we were doing our job".

== Post war ==
After the war, Jiggs started homesteading in Oakville, Ontario, where he met his wife Alma Giles. Alma was from Newfoundland and convinced Jiggs to move there. In 1953, the family and all their belongings were moved. They settled on a small plot of land between Bishop's Falls and Botwood. The farm was developed and went through many changes over the years—from vegetable to hog to poultry and egg farming. Jiggs has now turned the farm into a popular tourist attraction with a petting zoo, horseback riding, and a bed and breakfast among other things.

On January 18, 2013—the day Jiggs died—he was surrounded by family and friends. Just hours before his death, he was awarded the "Queen Elizabeth II Diamond Jubilee Medal" by Liberal MP Scott Simms on the Queen's behalf. This commemorative medal served to honour significant contributions and achievements by Canadians.

== See also ==
- List of people of Newfoundland and Labrador
