= SlowDroid =

Experimental denial of service attack

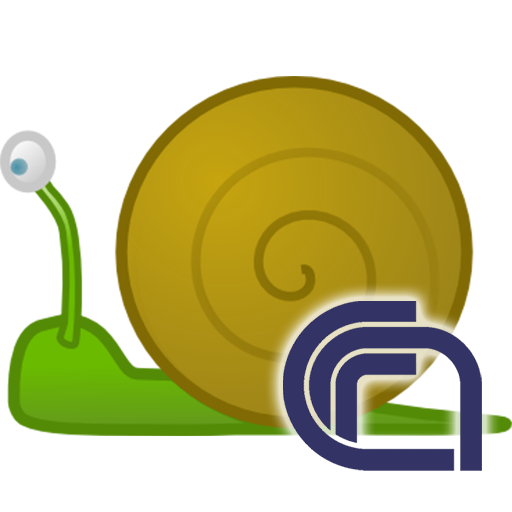

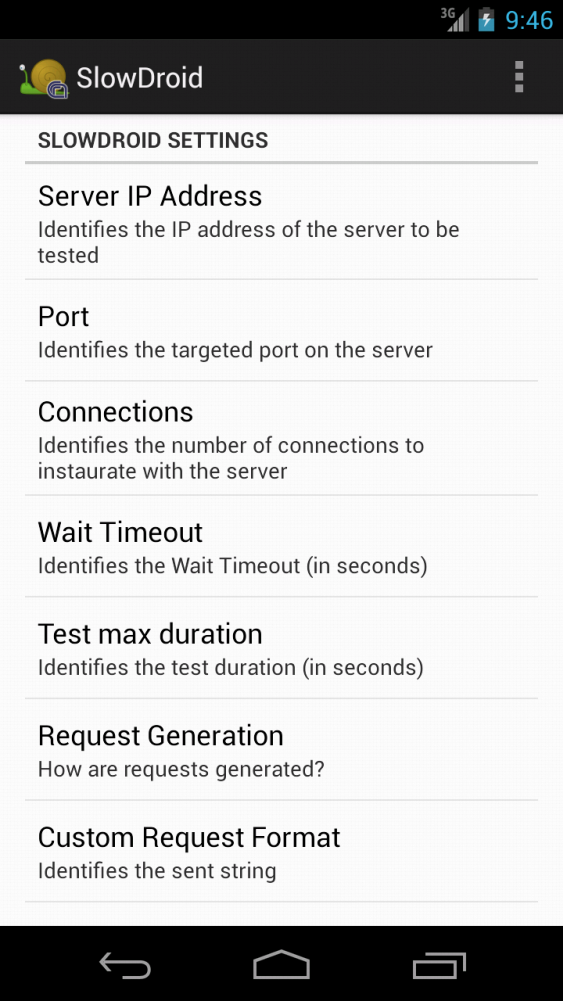
- Original authors: Enrico Cambiaso, Maurizio Aiello
- Developer: Enrico Cambiaso
- Release: 2013
- Preview release: 0.87.5
- Written in: Java
- Operating system: Android
- Size: 128 kb
- License: Creative Commons Attribution-NonCommercial-ShareAlike 3.0 Unported
- Website: www.ieiit.cnr.it/expertise/network-security

SlowDroid is the first denial of service attack which allows a single mobile device to take down a network server requiring minimal bandwidth. The attack has been created for research purposes by Enrico Cambiaso and Maurizio Aiello for the IEIIT Institute of the National Research Council of Italy and released as an Android application.

SlowDroid behavior is similar to other slow DoS attacks such as Slowloris, since it creates many connections with the victim in order to saturate the resources of the listening daemon application. One difference is on sent payload, which in case of SlowDroid is not compliant to a specific protocol: instead of sending a forged HTTP request, an endless sequence of spaces is sent instead. This characteristic makes SlowDroid able to target different protocols with the same payload. Another difference is on sending: during the data sending phase, instead of sending a sequence of characters as Slowloris does, SlowDroid sends a single character, hence reducing the bandwidth amounts. Finally, the main difference is on implementation: SlowDroid has been implemented to be executed on the Android mobile operating system platform.

SlowDroid was initially published on the Google Play Store. Due to developers terms of service, the application has been removed by the store.

SlowDroid can also be used as a botnet and it was used also by the Anonymous group of hacktivists.

SlowDroid was mentioned in an official European Commission document and it was presented in scientific conferences.

== See also ==
- Slowloris (cyber attack)
- Trinoo
- Stacheldraht
- Denial-of-service attack
- LAND
- Low Orbit Ion Cannon
- High Orbit Ion Cannon
