= Zemra =

Denial-of-service bot discovered in 2012

Zemra is a DDoS Bot which was first discovered in underground forums in May 2012.

Zemra is capable of HTTP and SYN Flood flooding and also has a simple Command & Control panel that is protected with 256-bit DES encryption for communicating with its command and control (C&C) server. Zemra also sends system information such as Computer name, Language settings, and Windows version. It sends this data to a remote server on a specific date and time. It also opens a backdoor on TCP port 7710 to receive commands from a remote command-and-control server, and it is able to monitor devices, collect system information, execute files, and even update or uninstall itself if necessary.

== See also ==
- Denial-of-service attack
- Dendroid (malware)
- High Orbit Ion Cannon
- Xor DDoS
- SYN flood
- Tribe Flood Network
- Trinoo
- Stacheldraht
- Low Orbit Ion Cannon
