= Malumpos =

Malumpos is a point of sale malware that are designed to steal or scrape customer’s credit and debit card detail from point of sale system. These are designed in a way that it records point of sale’s data which is running in an Oracle MICROS payment system of the restaurant. The collected data has been used in 333,000 customer sites around the world. Malumpos Malware targets hotels and other US businesses and put the retail customers at risk. This POS RAM Scraper is written in the Delphi programming language. Malumpos monitors, processes, scrapes the stolen data of the infected POS system and the RAM. First it stores the stolen credit or debit card details of the customer from the infected point of sale system once it is swiped. Then it sends the data to the cybercriminal to empty the customer bank balance or the details are sold to the black market.

== How Malumpos gets Installed ==
Much like the other point of sale malware, the Malumpos get into the computer unknowingly and conceals its identity as Nvidia Display Driver or Nvidia Display Driv3r. This malware appears to be legitimate software to the victims because all the peripherals function correctly. This malware infects Oracle MICROS, Oracle Forms, Shift4 systems and systems accessed via Internet Explorer.

== See also ==
- Point of sale
- Cyber security standards
- List of cyber attack threat trends
- Point-of-sale malware
- Malware
