= Tribe Flood Network =

Software that conducts DDoS attacks

Tribe FloodNet
- Original author: Mixter
- Stable release: 2k
- Written in: C
- Operating system: Windows, Solaris, Linux
- Size: 26.5 kb
- Type: Botnet
- Website: http://packetstormsecurity.org/distributed/tfn2k.tgz

The Tribe Flood Network or TFN is a set of computer programs to conduct various DDoS attacks such as ICMP flood, SYN flood, UDP flood and Smurf attack.

First TFN initiated attacks are described in CERT Incident Note 99-04.

TFN2K was written by Mixter, a security professional and hacker based in Germany.

== See also ==
- Stacheldraht
- Trinoo
- High Orbit Ion Cannon
- Low Orbit Ion Cannon
