= Algorithmic complexity attack =

An algorithmic complexity attack (ACA) is a form of attack in which an attacker sends a pattern of requests to a computer system that triggers the worst-case performance of the algorithms it uses. In turn, this may exhaust the resources the system uses. Examples of such attacks include ReDOS, zip bombs and exponential entity expansion attacks.

== Related works ==
- Grechishnikov, E V; Dobryshin, M M; Kochedykov, S S; Novoselcev, V I (April 2019). "Algorithmic model of functioning of the system to detect and counter cyber attacks on virtual private network". Journal of Physics: Conference Series. 1203 (1) 012064. Bibcode:2019JPhCS1203a2064G. doi:10.1088/1742-6596/1203/1/012064. S2CID 149475216. ProQuest 2566108871.
- Afek, Yehuda; Bremler-Barr, Anat; Harchol, Yotam; Hay, David; Koral, Yaron (December 2016). "Making DPI Engines Resilient to Algorithmic Complexity Attacks". IEEE/ACM Transactions on Networking. 24 (6): 3262–3275. doi:10.1109/TNET.2016.2518712. S2CID 14522075.
- Vahidi, Ardalan. "Crowdsourcing Phase and Timing of Pre-Timed Traffic Signals in the Presence of Queues: Algorithms and Back-End System Architecture." Ieeexplore, 1 Nov. 2019, https://ieeexplore.ieee.org/abstract/document/7323843.
- Kiner, Emil, and Satya Konduru. "How Google Cloud Blocked the Largest Layer 7 DDoS Attack yet, 46 Million Rps." Google Cloud Blog, 18 Aug. 2022, cloud.google.com/blog/products/identity-security/how-google-cloud-blocked-largest-layer-7-ddos-attack-at-46-million-rps.
