= Stacheldraht =

Malware for performing distributed denial of service attacks

- Stacheldraht attack diagram
- Original author(s): "random"
- Initial release: 1999
- Stable release: 4
- Repository: https://packetstormsecurity.com/distributed/stachel.tgz
- Written in: C
- Operating system: Linux, Solaris
- Size: 36 kB
- Type: Botnet
- Website: packetstormsecurity.org/distributed/stachel.tgz

Stacheldraht (German for "barbed wire") is malware which performs a distributed denial-of-service (DDoS) attack. It was written by "Thomas Stacheldraht", a member of the Austrian hacker group TESO. It was first released in 1999.

Stacheldraht uses a number of different denial-of-service (DoS) attack methods, including ping flood, UDP flood, TCP SYN flood, and Smurf attack. Further, it can detect and automatically enable source address forgery. Adding encryption, it combines features of Trinoo and of Tribe Flood Network. The software runs on both Linux and Solaris.

Stacheldraht was later superseded by Blitzkrieg, which was maintained by "random" and a loose group of associates.

== See also ==
- Low Orbit Ion Cannon (LOIC) – a stress test tool that has been used for DDoS attacks
- High Orbit Ion Cannon (HOIC) – the replacement for LOIC used in DDoS attacks
- Fork bomb
- Slowloris (computer security)
- ReDoS
