= Mixter =

Computer security specialist

Mixter is a computer security specialist. Mixter first made the transition out of the computer underground into large-scale public awareness, in 2000, at which time newspapers and magazines worldwide mentioned a link to massively destructive and effective distributed denial of service (DDoS) attacks which crippled and shut down major websites (including Yahoo!, Buy.com, eBay, Amazon, E-Trade, MSN.com, Dell, ZDNet and CNN). Early reports stated that the FBI-led National Infrastructure Protection Center (NIPC) was questioning Mixter regarding a tool called Stacheldraht (Barbed Wire). Although Mixter himself was not a suspect, his tool, the Tribe Flood Network (TFN) and an update called TFN2K were ultimately discovered as being the ones used in the attacks, causing an estimated $1.7 billion USD in damages.

In 2002 Mixter returned to the public eye, as the author of Hacktivismo's Six/Four System. The Six/Four System is a censorship resistant network proxy. It works by using "trusted peers" to relay network connections over SSL encrypted links. As an example, the distribution includes a program which will act as a web proxy, but all of the connections are hidden until they reach the far end trusted peer.
