= Alina (malware) =

Point of Sale Malware

Alina is point-of-sale malware and a RAM scraper that is used by cybercriminals to scrape credit card and debit card information from the point of sale system. It first started to scrape information in late 2012. It resembles JackPOS Malware.

== Process ==
Once executed, it gets installed on the user's computer and checks for updates. If an update is found, it removes the existing Alina code and installs the latest version. Then, for new installations, it adds the file path to an AutoStart runkey to maintain persistence. Finally, it adds java.exe to the %APPDATA% directory and executes it using the parameter alina=<path_to_executable> for new installations or, update=<orig_exe>;<new_exe> for upgrades.

Alina inspects the user's processes with the help of Windows API calls:

- CreateToolhelp32Snapshot() takes a snapshot of all running processes
- Process32First()/Process32Next() retrieve the track 1 and track 2 information in the process memory

Alina maintains a blacklist of processes, if there is no process information in the blacklist it uses OpenProcess() to read and process the contents in the memory dump. Once the data is scraped Alina sends it to C&C servers using an HTTP POST command that is hardcoded in binary.

== See also ==
- Point-of-sale malware
- Cyber security standards
- List of cyber attack threat trends
