= Backoff =

Backoff may refer to:

- Backoff (malware)
- Exponential backoff in computer networking
- Katz's back-off model, the n-gram language model
