= UDP flood attack =

Type of denial-of-service

A UDP flood attack is a volumetric denial-of-service (DoS) attack using the User Datagram Protocol (UDP), a sessionless/connectionless computer networking protocol.

Using UDP for denial-of-service attacks is not as straightforward as with the Transmission Control Protocol (TCP). However, a UDP flood attack can be initiated by sending a large number of UDP packets to random ports on a remote host. As a result, the distant host will:

- Check for the application listening at that port;
- See that no application listens at that port;
- Reply with an ICMP Destination Unreachable packet.

Thus, for a large number of UDP packets, the victimized system will be forced into sending many ICMP packets, eventually leading it to be unreachable by other clients. The attacker(s) may also spoof the IP address of the UDP packets, ensuring that the excessive ICMP return packets do not reach them, and anonymizing their network location(s). Most operating systems mitigate this part of the attack by limiting the rate at which ICMP responses are sent.

Tools for performing UDP flood attacks include:

- Low Orbit Ion Cannon
- UDP Unicorn

This attack can be managed by deploying firewalls at key points in a network to filter out unwanted network traffic. The potential victim never receives and never responds to the malicious UDP packets because the firewall stops them. However, as firewalls are 'stateful' i.e. can only hold a number of sessions, firewalls can also be susceptible to flood attacks.
