= Email bomb =

Malicious email abuse

On Internet usage, an email bomb is a form of network abuse that sends large volumes of email to an address to overflow the mailbox, overwhelm the server where the email address is hosted in a denial-of-service attack or as a smoke screen to distract the attention from important email messages indicating a security breach.

== Methods ==
There are three methods of perpetrating an email bomb, namely mass mailing, list linking and zip bombing.

=== Mass mailing ===
Mass mailing consists of sending numerous duplicate emails to the same email address. These types of mail bombs are simple to design, but their extreme simplicity means they can be easily detected by spam filters. Email-bombing using mass mailing is also commonly performed as a denial-of-service attack by employing the use of "zombie" botnets — hierarchical networks of computers compromised by malware and under the attacker's control. Similar to their use in spamming, the attacker instructs the botnet to send out millions of emails, but unlike normal botnet spamming, the emails are all addressed to only one or a few addresses the attacker wishes to flood. This form of email bombing is similar to other denial-of-service flooding attacks. As the targets are frequently the dedicated hosts handling Web site and email accounts of a business, this type of attack can be devastating to both services of the host.

This type of attack is more difficult to defend against than a simple mass-mailing bomb because of the multiple source addresses and the possibility of each zombie computer sending a different message or employing stealth techniques to defeat spam filters.

=== List linking ===
List linking, also known as "email cluster bomb", means signing a particular email address up to several email list subscriptions. The victim then has to unsubscribe from these unwanted services manually. The attack can be carried out with automatically with scripts, making it easy, almost impossible to trace back to the perpetrator, and potentially very destructive. A massive attack of this kind targeting .gov email addresses was observed in August 2016. The email messages in the flood are not spoofed as these are typically confirmation emails for newsletters and subscriptions for legitimate Internet services. The attacker exploits websites that allow Internet clients to register to some service with their email address. The attacker registers the victim with its email address to multiple such services, which, as a result, send emails to the victim.

In order to prevent this type of bombing, most email subscription services send a confirmation email to a person's inbox when that email is used to register for a subscription. However, even the confirmation emails contribute to the attack. A better defense would prevent websites from being exploited without abandoning subscription forms. After a subscription form is filled out, the website would dynamically create a "mailto" link to itself. A legitimate user would then send a message to validate the request without receiving any email from the site. While the sender's email could be spoofed, the sender's SMTP IP address cannot. Therefore, the list manager can verify that the email in the form request matches the originating SMTP server in the validation message.

A large number of confirmation emails initiated by registration bots signing up a specific email address to a multitude of services can be used to distract the view from important emails indicating that a security breach has happened elsewhere. If, for example, an Amazon account has been hacked, the hacker may contrive to have a flood of confirmation emails sent to the email address associated with the account to mask the fact that the Amazon shipment address has been changed and purchases have been made by the hacker.

=== Zip bombing ===
A zip bomb is a variant of mail-bombing. After most commercial mail servers began checking mail with antivirus software and filtering certain potentially malicious attached file types, such as .exe, .RAR, .ZIP and 7-Zip, mail server software was then configured to unpack archives and check their contents as well. A new idea to combat this solution was composing a "bomb" consisting of an enormous text file, containing, for example, only the letter z repeating millions of times. Such a file compresses into a relatively small archive, but its unpacking (especially by early versions of mail servers) would use a greater amount of processing, which could result in a denial of service. A .ZIP or .tar.gz file can even contain a copy of itself, causing infinite recursion if the server checks nested archive files.

== Text message bomb ==
A "text bomb" is a similar variant of sending a large number of text messages over SMS. The technique is a means of cyberbullying or online harassment. Application programs ("apps") online on the Android operating system have since been banned as a means of sending text bombs. The text messages may also lead to high phone bill charges on some mobile plans. Additionally, certain phone apps have also been created to prevent text bombs on Android.
