= Memory-scraping malware =

Computer's memory scrapping malware

Memory-scraping malware or RAM Scrapping malware is a malware that scans the memory of digital devices, notably point-of-sale (POS) systems, to collect sensitive personal information, such as credit card numbers and personal identification numbers (PIN) for the purpose of exploitation.

== Operation ==
The magnetic stripe of payment cards hold three different data tracks – Track 1, Track 2 and Track 3. The POS RAM scrapers were created to implement the use of expression matches to gain access and collect the Track 1 and Track 2 card data from the RAM process memory. Some RAM scrapers use the Luhn algorithm to check the validity of card data before exfiltration.

== See also ==
- Point-of-sale malware
