= Low Orbit Ion Cannon =

Network testing and denial-of-service app

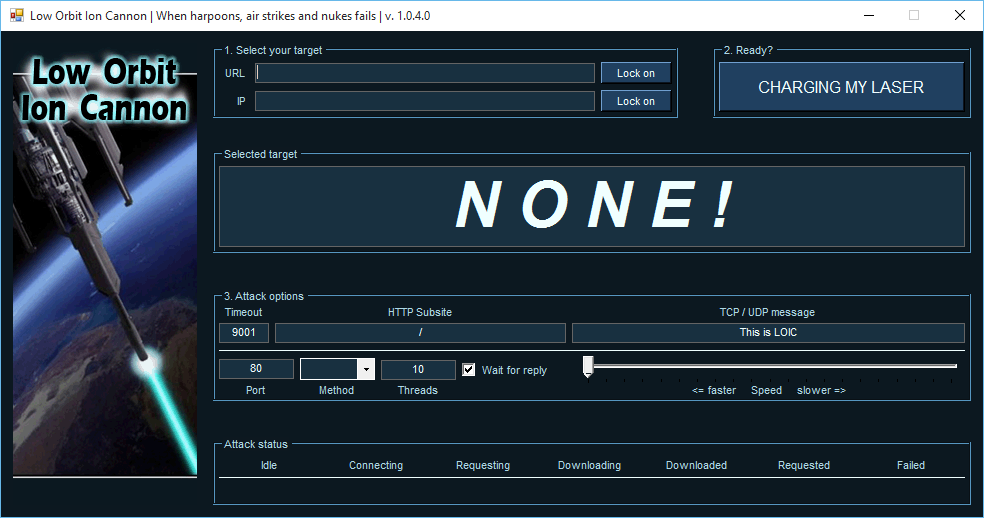
- Original author: Praetox Technologies
- Final release: 1.0.8 / 13 Dec 2014; 11 years ago
- Written in: C#
- Operating system: Windows, Linux, OS X, Android, iOS
- Platform: .NET, Mono
- Size: 131 KB
- Available in: English
- Type: Network testing
- License: Public domain

Low Orbit Ion Cannon (LOIC) is an open-source network stress testing and denial-of-service attack application written in C#. LOIC was initially developed by Praetox Technologies; however, it was later released into the public domain and is currently available on various open-source platforms.

== Characteristics ==
LOIC performs a DoS attack (or, when used by multiple individuals, a DDoS attack) on a target site by flooding the server with TCP, UDP, or HTTP packets with the intention of disrupting the service of a particular host. People have used LOIC to join voluntary botnets.

The software inspired an independent JavaScript version called JS LOIC in addition to a LOIC-derived web version called Low Orbit Web Cannon. These enable a DoS from a web browser.

== Countermeasures ==
Security experts quoted by the BBC indicated that well-written firewall rules can filter out most traffic from DDoS attacks by LOIC, thus preventing the attacks from being fully effective. In at least one instance, filtering out all UDP and ICMP traffic blocked a LOIC attack. Firewall rules of this sort are more likely to be effective when implemented at a point upstream of an application server's Internet uplink to avoid the uplink from exceeding its capacity.

LOIC attacks are easily identified in system logs, and the attack can be tracked down to the IP addresses used.

== Usage ==
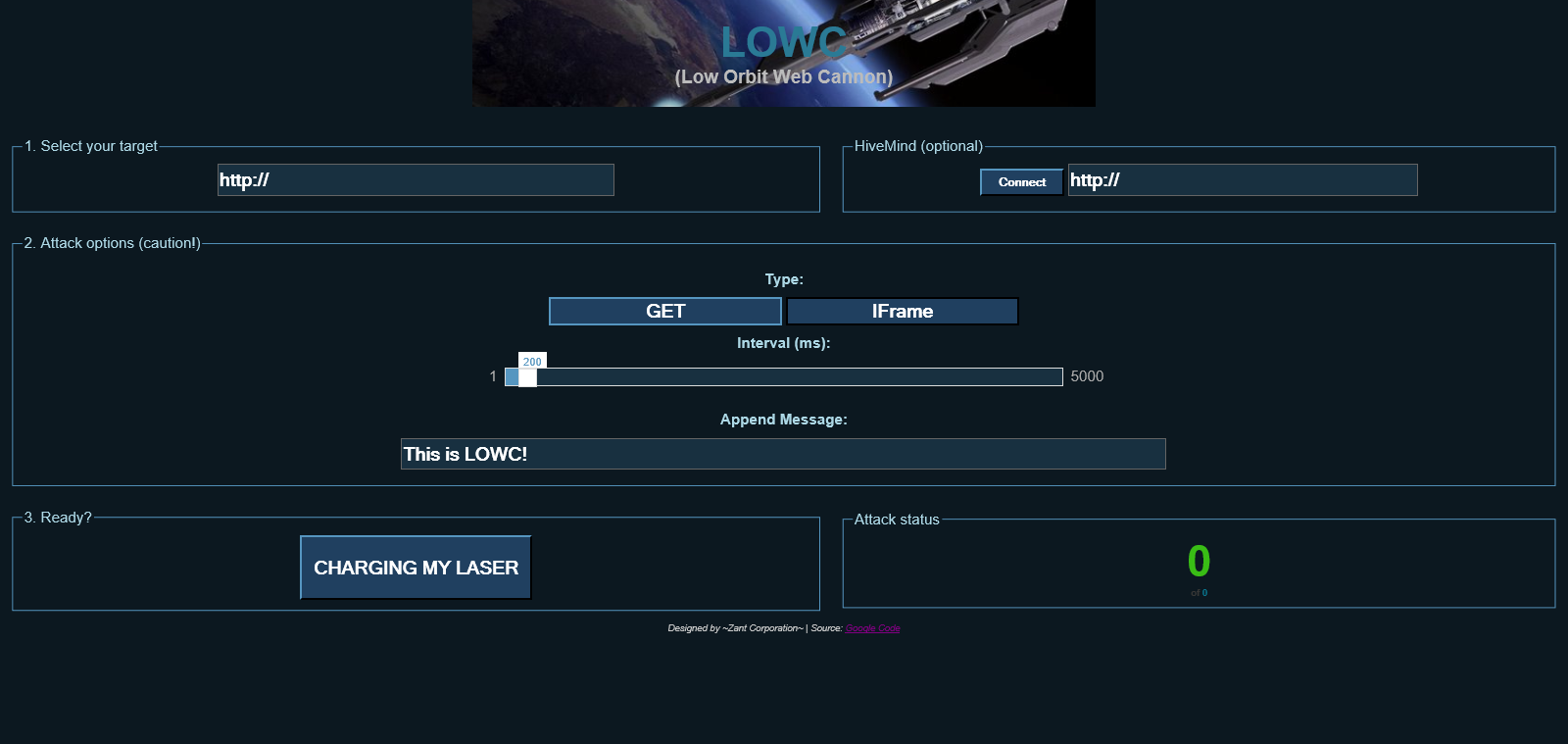
A screenshot of LOWC (Low Orbit Web Cannon) running in a web browser.

LOIC was used by Anonymous (a group that spawned from the /b/ board of 4chan) during Project Chanology to attack websites from the Church of Scientology, once more to (successfully) attack the Recording Industry Association of America's website in October 2010, and it was again used by Anonymous during their Operation Payback in December 2010 to attack the websites of companies and organizations that opposed WikiLeaks.

In retaliation for the shutdown of the file sharing service Megaupload and the arrest of four workers, members of Anonymous launched a DDoS attack upon the websites of Universal Music Group (the company responsible for the lawsuit against Megaupload), the United States Department of Justice, the United States Copyright Office, the Federal Bureau of Investigation, the MPAA, Warner Music Group and the RIAA, as well as the HADOPI, all on the afternoon of January 19, 2012, through LOIC. In general, the attack hoped to retaliate against those who Anonymous members believed harmed their digital freedoms.

== Origin of name ==
The LOIC application is named after the ion cannon, a fictional weapon from many sci-fi works, video games, and in particular after its namesake from the Command & Conquer series. The artwork used in the application was a concept art for Command & Conquer 3: Tiberium Wars.

== In popular culture ==
The song "Low Orbit Ion Cannon" on Emperor X's 2017 album Oversleepers International directly references the software.

== See also ==
- Fork bomb
- High Orbit Ion Cannon
- LAND
- Ping of death
- ReDoS
- Zemra
- White Hat (computer security)
