= High Orbit Ion Cannon =

Denial-of-service attack tool

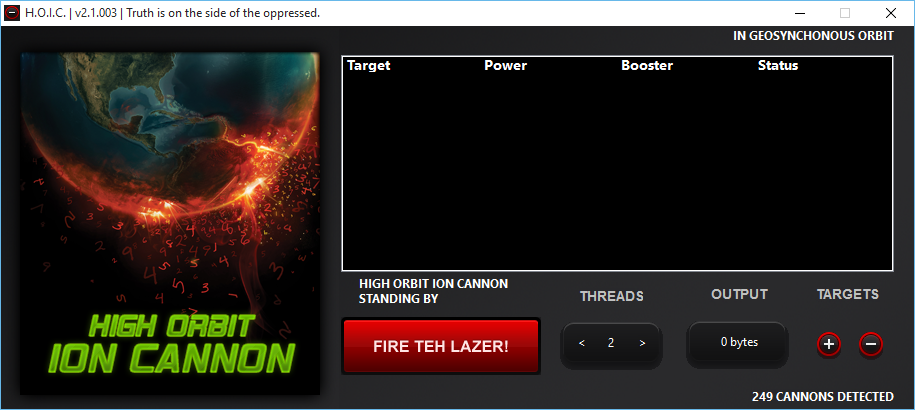
- HOIC running on Windows 10
- Written in: Visual Basic, C#
- Operating system: Windows, OS X, Linux
- Size: 1.8 MB
- Available in: English
- Type: Network stress-testing
- License: Public domain
- Website: sourceforge.net/projects/high-orbit-ion-cannon/

High Orbit Ion Cannon (HOIC) is an open-source network stress testing and denial-of-service attack application designed to attack as many as 256 URLs at the same time. It was designed to replace the Low Orbit Ion Cannon which was developed by Praetox Technologies and later released into the public domain. The security advisory for HOIC was released by Prolexic Technologies in February 2012.

== Development ==
HOIC was developed during the conclusion of Operation Payback by the hacktivist collective Anonymous. As Operation Payback concluded there was massive pressure on the group from law enforcement agencies, which captured and prosecuted more than 13 individuals connected with the group. This forced many members of the group to rethink their strategies and subsequently this part of the group launched Operation Leakspin. However a large part of Anonymous remained focused on launching opt-in DDoS attacks. However the Low Orbit Ion Cannon was not powerful enough to launch attacks with such a limited number of users. HOIC was designed to remedy this with the ability to cause an HTTP Flood with as few as 50 user agents being required to successfully launch an attack, and co-ordination between multiple users leading to an exponential increase in the damage. HOIC was the first tool of its kind to have support for the so-called "booster files", configurable VBS script modules that randomize the HTTP headers of attacking computers, allowing thousands upon thousands of highly randomized combinations for user agents. Apart from allowing user agents to implement some form of randomization countermeasures the booster files can and have been used to increase the magnitude of the attack.

== Nomenclature ==
HOIC and its predecessor, the LOIC, are named after an ion cannon, a fictional directed-energy weapon described as firing beams of ions from a space-based platform onto Earth-based targets. Although ion cannons appear in many movies, television shows, and video games that have a science fiction-based setting, the ones depicted in the Command & Conquer series of video games are considered to be the inspiration for the graphics on the software's GUI and website.

== Use ==
Simply described, HOIC is a program for sending HTTP POST and GET requests at a computer under attack, that uses a lulz-inspired graphical interface. HOIC primarily performs a denial-of-service (DoS) attack and a DDoS attack when co-ordinated by multiple individuals. The denial-of-service (DoS) attack on the target URL is accomplished by sending excessive traffic in an attempt to overload the site and bring it down. This basic version of the attack can be customized by using the booster files which follow the VB 6 mixed with VB .NET syntax. In addition, HOIC can simultaneously attack up to 256 domains, making it one of the most versatile tools for hackers who are attempting to co-ordinate DDoS attacks as a group.

The minimalist GUI of the tool makes it user friendly and easy to control. The basic routine of an attack is to input the URL of the website which is to be attacked, and set the power option on low, medium or high. The power option sets the request velocity with low at two requests per second, medium at four and high at eight requests per second. Then a booster file is added which uses .hoic extension to define dynamic request attributes, launch attacks on multiple pages within the same website and help evade some defense filters. The attack is then launched by pressing the red button in the GUI labelled as "Fire Teh Lazer".

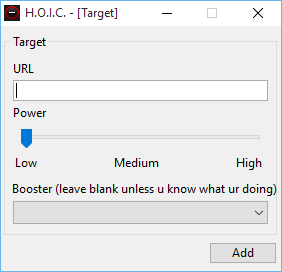
High Orbit Ion Cannon's interface for targeting a website for stressing

== Limitations ==
The basic limitation of HOIC is that it requires a coordinated group of users to ensure that the attacks are successful. Even though it has allowed attacks to be launched by far fewer users than the older Low Orbit Ion Cannon, HOIC still requires a minimum of 50 users to launch an effective attack and more are required to sustain it if the target website has protection. Another limiting factor is the lack of anonymizing and randomizing capability. Even though HOIC should, in theory, offer anonymizing through the use of booster files, the actual protection provided is not enough. Furthermore, anonymizing networks such as Tor are not capable of handling the bandwidth of attacks generated by HOIC. Any attempt to launch an attack using the Tor network is likely to harm the network itself by exhausting its limited bandwidth. However, Anonymous members routinely use proxy servers based in Sweden to launch their attacks. It has been speculated that this is due to the notion that Sweden may have less internet privacy laws than the rest of the world.

== Legality ==
Primarily, HOIC has been designed as a stress testing tool and can be lawfully used as such to stress test local networks and servers provided the person initiating the test has authorization to test and as long as no other networks, servers, clients, networking equipment or URLs are disrupted.

HOIC can also be used to perform distributed denial-of-service attacks, which are illegal under various statutes. The Police and Justice Act 2006 of the United Kingdom amended the Computer Misuse Act 1990, and specifically outlawed denial-of-service attacks and set a maximum penalty of 10 years in prison. In the United States, denial-of-service attacks may be considered a federal crime under the Computer Fraud and Abuse Act with penalties that include up to ten years of imprisonment. In 2013 criminal charges were brought against 13 members of Anonymous for participating in a DDoS attack against various websites of organizations including the Recording Industry Association of America, the Motion Picture Association of America, the United States Copyright Office of the Library of Congress, Visa, MasterCard, and Bank of America. They were charged with one count of "conspiracy to intentionally cause damage to a protected computer" for the events that occurred between September 16, 2010 and January 2, 2011. DDoS attacks are federal offenses in the United States and are prosecuted by the Department of Justice under USC Title 18, Section 1030.

In 2013, Anonymous petitioned the United States government via We the People, demanding that DDoS attacks be recognized as a form of virtual protest similar to Occupy protests.

== Countermeasures ==
DDoS mitigation usually works on the principle of distribution, which is basically intelligent routing of traffic to avoid congestion and prevent overload at a single URL. Other methods to counter DDoS include installation of intrusion prevention system (IPS) and intrusion detection system (IDS) devices and application software.

== First use in attacks ==
Anonymous were the first group to utilize High Orbit Ion Cannon publicly on January 19, 2012. After Megaupload, a file-sharing website, was shut down following federal agents raiding their premises, Anonymous launched an attack against the website of the US Department of Justice. As the DOJ website went offline, Anonymous claimed success via Twitter, saying "One thing is certain: EXPECT US! #Megaupload". Over the course of the next few hours, several other websites were knocked offline and kept offline. These included websites belonging to the Recording Industry Association of America (RIAA), the Motion Picture Association of America (MPAA) and the BMI. Finally, as the day drew to a close, the website belonging to the FBI was hit repeatedly before it ultimately succumbed to attacks and acquired a “Tango Down” status. Anonymous claimed that it was "the single largest Internet attack in its history", while it was reported that as many as 27,000 user agents were taking part in the attack.

== See also ==
- Anonymous (group)
- Application layer DDoS attack
- DDoS mitigation
- Denial-of-service attack
- DoSnet
- Fork bomb
- Hit-and-run DDoS
- Infinite loop
- Low Orbit Ion Cannon
- Operation Leakspin
- Operation Payback
- ReDoS
