= List of cybersecurity information technologies =

This is a list of cybersecurity information technologies. Cybersecurity concerns all technologies that store, manipulate, or move computer data, such as computers, data networks, and all devices connected to or included in said networks, such as routers and switches. All information technology devices and facilities need to be secured against intrusion, unauthorized use, and vandalism. Users of information technology are to be protected from theft of assets, extortion, identity theft, loss of privacy, damage to equipment, business process compromise, and general disruption. The public should be protected against acts of cyberterrorism, such as compromise or denial of service.

Cybersecurity is a major endeavor in the IT industry. There are a number of professional certifications given for cybersecurity training and expertise. Billions of dollars are spent annually on cybersecurity, but no computer or network is immune from attacks or can be considered completely secure.

This article attempts to list important Wikipedia articles about cybersecurity.

== General ==
Introductory articles about cybersecurity subjects:

- Security
- Computer security
- Internet security
- Network security
- Information security, Data security
- List of computer security certifications

== Cryptography ==
The art of secret writing or code. A "plaintext" message is converted by the sender to "ciphertext" by means of a mathematical algorithm that uses a secret key. The receiver of the message then reverses the process and converts the ciphertext back to the original plaintext.

=== Cryptography subject matter ===
- Plaintext
- Ciphertext
- Encryption
- Decryption
- History of cryptography
- Alan Turing
- Cipher
- Cryptanalysis
- Cryptographic primitive
- Cryptographic Service Provider
- HMAC
- HMAC-based One-time Password algorithm
- Cryptographic hash function
- Hash collision
- Hash-based cryptography
- Cryptographic nonce
- Salt (cryptography)
- Cryptographic strength
- Block cipher
- Block cipher mode of operation
- Stream cipher
- Key (cryptography)
- Key size
- Cryptographic key types
- Symmetric-key cryptography
- Public-key cryptography (sometimes called Asymmetric-key cryptography)
- Public-Key Cryptography (conference)
- Digital signature
- Non-repudiation
- Public key certificate
- Certificate authority
- Public key fingerprint
- Secret sharing
- Internet key exchange
- Strong cryptography
- Brute-force attack
- Dictionary attack
- Padding oracle attack
- Pass the hash

=== Cipher technologies ===
- Enigma machine
- Caesar Cipher
- Vigenére cipher
- Substitution cipher
- One-time pad
- Beale ciphers
- The Codebreakers
- Data Encryption Standard
- Advanced Encryption Standard
- International Data Encryption Algorithm
- List of hash functions
- Comparison of cryptographic hash functions
- SHA-1
- SHA-2
- SHA-3
- SHA-3 competition
- RSA (cryptosystem)
- X.509
- Pretty Good Privacy
- Diffie-Hellman key exchange
- Blowfish (cipher)

== Steganography ==
Steganography is the process of hiding data within other data, most commonly by hiding data inside images.

- BPCS-Steganography
- Steganography tools
- Steganalysis
- OpenPuff
- Kristie Macrakis

== Authentication and access ==
The process by which a potential client is granted authorized use of an IT facility by proving its identity.

- Authentication
- Login
- Password
- Passphrase
- Password strength
- One-time password
- Multi-factor authentication
- Identity management
- Identity management theory
- Identity management system
- Encrypting PIN Pad
- Shared secret
- Authorization
- Access control
- Principle of least privilege
- Cryptographic protocol
- Authentication protocol
- Public key infrastructure
- RADIUS
- Kerberos (protocol)
- OpenID
- OAuth
- Active Directory Federation Services
- Security Assertion Markup Language
- SAML-based products and services

== Public Key Infrastructure (PKI) ==
A framework for managing digital certificates and encryption keys.

- Public key infrastructure
- X.509
- Root certificate
- Public key certificate
- Certificate authority
- Digital signature
- Certificate policy
- Certificate Practice Statement
- Certificate revocation list
- Online Certificate Status Protocol

== Tools ==
Computerized utilities designed to study and analyze the security of IT facilities and/or break into them on an unauthorized and potentially criminal basis.

- List of security assessment tools
- Kali
- Security Administrator Tool for Analyzing Networks
- Nessus (software)
- Vulnerability scanner
- Nessus Attack Scripting Language
- OpenVAS
- Yasca
- Metasploit project
- John the Ripper
- Smeg Virus Construction Kit
- Virus Creation Laboratory
- Exploit kit

== Threats ==
Modes of potential attacks on IT facilities.

- Cyberattack
- STRIDE (security)
- Vulnerability (computing)
- Common Vulnerabilities and Exposures
- Privilege escalation
- Social engineering (security)
- Malware
- Spyware
- Backdoor (computing)
- Computer virus
- Computer worm
- Macro virus
- Keystroke logging
- Trojan horse
- Hardware Trojan
- Eavesdropping
- Zombie
- Botnets
- Advanced persistent threat
- Man-in-the-middle attack
- Man-on-the-side attack
- Meet-in-the-middle attack
- Length extension attack
- Replay attack
- Pre-play attack
- Dictionary attack
- Biclique attack
- Denial-of-service attack
- Resource exhaustion attack
- Brute-force attack
- Watermarking attack
- Mangled packet
- Reverse connection
- Polymorphic code
- Password cracking
- Spoofing attack
- POODLE

== Exploits ==
Security exploits affecting computers.

- Exploit (computer security)
- Timeline of computer viruses and worms
- Malware analysis
- XML denial-of-service attack
- Distributed denial-of-service attacks on root nameservers
- Linux malware
- Zero-day (computing)
- Virus hoax
- Pegasus
- Rogue security software
- MS Antivirus (malware)
- Spysheriff
- SpywareBot
- TheSpyBot
- Security Essentials 2010
- Email spam
- Phishing
- Tiny Banker Trojan
- Melissa (computer virus)
- Brain (computer virus)
- CIH (computer virus)
- ILOVEYOU
- Anna Kournikova (computer virus)
- Michelangelo (computer virus)
- Simile (computer virus)
- Stoned (computer virus)
- Acme (computer virus)
- AIDS (computer virus)
- Cascade (computer virus)
- Flame (computer virus)
- Abraxas (computer virus)
- 1260 (computer virus)
- SCA (computer virus)
- ReDoS
- SYN flood
- Billion laughs attack
- UDP flood attack
- Wi-Fi deauthentication attack
- Smurf attack
- Mydoom
- IP address spoofing
- Fork bomb
- WinNuke

== Criminal activity ==
Violation of the law by means of breaking into and/or misusing IT facilities. Laws that attempt to prevent these crimes.

- Computer misuse act
- Cyber-security regulation
- China Internet Security Law
- Computer Crime and Intellectual Property Section
- Cyber criminals
- Cybercrime
- Security hacker
- White hat (computer security)
- Black hat (computer security)
- Industrial espionage § Use of computers and the Internet
- Phreaking
- RDP shop
- Market for zero-day exploits
- 2600 magazine
- Phrack, Google search on “hacker magazine”
- Identity theft
- Identity fraud
- Cyberstalking
- Cyberbullying

== Nation states ==
Countries and their governments that use, misuse, and/or violate IT facilities to achieve national goals.

- Cyber-arms industry
- Computer and network surveillance
- List of government surveillance projects
- Clipper chip
- Targeted surveillance
- United States Cyber Command
- Cybersecurity and Infrastructure Security Agency
- National Cybersecurity and Communications Integration Center
- Bletchley Park
- NSO Group
- Hacking Team
- Unit 8200
- NSA
- Room 641A
- Narus (company)
- Equation group
- Tailored Access Operations
- XKeyscore
- PRISM (surveillance program)
- Stuxnet
- Carnivore (software)

== End-point protection ==
The securing of networked computers, mobile devices and terminals.

- Antivirus software
- Lookout (IT security)
- Windows Defender
- Kaspersky Lab
- Malwarebytes
- Avast Antivirus
- Norton AntiVirus
- AVG AntiVirus
- McAfee
- McAfee VirusScan
- Symantec Endpoint Protection
- Microsoft Safety Scanner
- Windows Malicious Software Removal Tool
- VirusTotal
- Application firewall
- Personal firewall
- SentinelOne

== Network protection ==
The protection of the means by which data is moved from one IT facility to another.

- Virtual private network
- IPsec
- Internet Key Exchange
- Internet Security Association and Key Management Protocol
- Kerberized Internet Negotiation of Keys
- Firewall (computing)
- Stateful firewall
- HTTPS
- HTTP Public Key Pinning
- Transport Layer Security
- TLS acceleration
- Network Security Services
- Off the record messaging
- Secure Shell
- Circuit-level gateway
- Intrusion detection system
- Intrusion Detection Message Exchange Format
- Security information management
- Security information and event management
- Security event manager
- Router (computing)#Security
- Security log
- Intranet § Enterprise private network
- Proxy server

== Processing protection ==
The securing of IT facilities that manipulate data, such as computer servers, often by means of specialized cybersecurity hardware.

- Hardware security module
- Secure cryptoprocessor
- Trusted Platform Module
- Unified Extensible Firmware Interface § Secure Boot
- Executable-space protection

== Storage protection ==
The protection of data in its non-moving state, usually on magnetic or optical media or in computer memory.

- Disk encryption
- Disk encryption theory
- Disk encryption software
- Comparison of disk encryption software
- BitLocker
- Encrypting File System
- Filesystem-level encryption
- Disk encryption hardware
- Hardware-based full disk encryption
- Personal data
- General Data Protection Regulation
- Privacy policy
- Information security audit
- Information technology audit
- Information technology security audit

== Management of security ==
The processes by which security technology is monitored for faults, deployed and configured, measured for its usage, queried for performance metrics and log files, and/or monitored for intrusions.

- Information security management
- FCAPS § Security management

== Standards, frameworks, & requirements ==
Officially agreed architectures and conceptual structures for designing, building, and conducting cybersecurity.

- NIST Cybersecurity Framework
- National Initiative for Cybersecurity Education
- Center for Internet Security
- The CIS Critical Security Controls for Effective Cyber Defense
- Cyber Risk Quantification
- Risk management framework
- IT risk
- Risk IT
- ISO/IEC 27000-series
- Cyber-security regulation
- Health Insurance Portability and Accountability Act § Security Rule
- Federal Information Security Management Act of 2002

== See also ==
- Outline of computer security
