= Chabanov (surname) =

Chabanov (masculine, Russian: Чабанов) or Chabanova (feminine, Russian: Чабанова) is a Russian-language surname. Notable people with the surname include:

- Pavlo Chabanov (born 1986), Ukrainian motorsport athlete, IT entrepreneur, developer, startupper, investor, and philanthropist
- Yevgeni Chabanov (born 1997), Russian football player

== See also ==
- Shabanov
