= Smurf Amplifier Registry =

The Smurf Amplifier Registry was a blacklist of networks on the Internet which have been misconfigured in such a way that they can be used as smurf amplifiers for smurf denial of service attacks.

It was able probe networks for vulnerability to smurf amplification on user request, and it then either added them to its database, or removed them from the database, depending on the result of the test.
