= Smeg =

Smeg or SMEG may refer to:

- Smeg (appliances), an Italian company
- Smeg Virus Construction Kit, for computer viruses
- Shanghai Media & Entertainment Group, a media conglomerate in China
- SMEG (menu editor), Simple Menu Editor for GNOME
- Société Monégasque de l'Electricité et du Gaz, Monaco's supplier of electricity and gas
- Smeg, a fictional profanity from the British science fiction sitcom Red Dwarf
- Smeg, a slang term for smegma.
