= Stresser =

Services providing denial-of-service attacks

Stresser (or booter) services provide denial-of-service attack as a service, usually as a criminal enterprise.

They have simple front ends, and accept payment over the web. Marketed and promoted as stress-testing tools, they can be used to perform unauthorized denial-of-service attacks, and allow technically unsophisticated attackers access to sophisticated attack tools. Usually powered by a botnet, the traffic produced by a consumer stresser can range anywhere from 5-50 Gbit/s, which can, in most cases, deny the average home user internet access.

Targets of booter/stresser services include network gaming services. Motivations for the use of stresser services include revenge, extortion, and simple mischief.

== Law enforcement activity ==
The use or provision of booter/stresser services for unauthorized DDoS attacks is illegal in both the United States and the United Kingdom under the Computer Fraud and Abuse Act and Computer Misuse Act 1990 respectively.

In 2023 it was revealed that a cross-industry organization called "Big Pipes" with representatives from major Internet companies had been working with law enforcement to find and shut down illegal booter/stresser services for the previous five years.

The UK National Crime Agency has set up numerous "honeypot" websites purporting to be booter/stresser services. The details of people registering with these fake services are logged.

== See also ==
- Cyberattack
- Operation PowerOFF
