= DNS Flood =

Denial-of-service attack directed at a DNS server

DNS Flood is a type of denial-of-service attack. It is the process whereby the traffic on a network resource or machine is stopped for some time. The offender sends a great number of requests to the resource or machine so that it might become unavailable to those who might try to reach it. During a DNS flood the host that connects to the Internet is disrupted due to an overload of traffic. It can be referred to as a disruption that causes the work of the resource or machine to halt by not allowing the traffic to land on it.

This attack is mainly done by hackers to benefit from the attacked resource or machine. DDoS attacks have been perpetrated for many reasons, including blackmailing website owners and knocking out websites, including high-profile sites such as large bank websites.

Many methods can and are being adopted to prevent these types of attacks some of which include dropping malformed packages, use filters to avoid receiving packages from sources having potential to attack, timing out half open connections with greater hostility. One can also set SYN, ICMP, and UDP at lower levels to prevent such DDoS attacks from harming one's network.
