= WinNuke =

Windows denial-of-service exploit

In computer security, WinNuke is an example of a Nuke remote denial-of-service attack (DoS) exploit that affected the Microsoft Windows 3.1x, Windows NT 3x, Windows 95 and Windows NT 4 computer operating systems. The exploit sent a string of Out-of-band data (OOB data) to the target computer on TCP port 139 (NetBIOS), causing it to lock up and display a Blue Screen of Death (BSOD). This does not damage or change the data on the computer's hard disk, but any unsaved data would be lost. This exploit has been patched with the release of Windows Socket 2 update for Windows 95 and Service Pack 3 for Windows NT 4. Windows 98 RC0, Windows 2000 and newer operating systems are not vulnerable to this exploit. In 2002, a second incarnation of the similar exploit that utilized Network Share Provider appeared, was identified by Microsoft in 2004 and was patched subsequently. Windows Vista and newer Microsoft Operating Systems are immune to both of these exploits.

== Details ==
The so-called OOB simply means that the malicious TCP packet contained an Urgent pointer (URG). The "Urgent pointer" is a rarely used field in the TCP header, used to indicate that some of the data in the TCP stream should be processed quickly by the recipient. Affected operating systems did not handle the Urgent pointer field correctly.

A person under the screen-name "_eci" published C source code for the exploit on May 9, 1997. With the source code being widely used and distributed, Microsoft was forced to create security patches, which were released a few weeks later. For a time, numerous flavors of this exploit appeared going by such names as fedup, gimp, killme, killwin, knewkem, liquidnuke, mnuke, netnuke, muerte, nuke, nukeattack, nuker102, pnewq, project1, pstlince, simportnuke, sprite, sprite32, vconnect, vzmnuker, wingenocide, winnukeit, winnuker02, winnukev95, wnuke3269, wnuke4, and wnuke95.

A company called SemiSoft Solutions from New Zealand created a small program, called AntiNuke, that blocks WinNuke without having to install the official patch.

== Second Incarnation ==
In 2002, a second incarnation of WinNuke that utilized similar exploit involving Network Share Provider appeared that affected Microsoft Windows NT 4, Windows 2000 and Windows XP operating systems and also affected Microsoft .NET Framework as well. This exploit was identified by Microsoft in 2004 and was patched for Windows 2000 and Windows XP, and also was included as part of Service Pack 2 for Windows XP as well. Windows NT 4 with Service Pack 6a remains unpatched for this second incarnation of the exploit, but received the same hotfix (MS02-045, KB326830) as a separate download.

== See also ==
- Ping of death
