= VoIP vulnerabilities =

VoIP vulnerabilities are weaknesses in the VoIP protocol or its implementations that expose users to privacy violations and other problems. VoIP is a group of technologies that enable voice calls online. VoIP contains similar vulnerabilities to those of other internet use.

Risks are not usually mentioned to potential customers. VoIP provides no specific protections against fraud and illicit practices.

== Vulnerabilities ==
=== Eavesdropping ===
Unencrypted connections are vulnerable to security breaches. Hackers/trackers can eavesdrop on conversations and extract valuable data through microphones.

=== Network attacks ===
Attacks on the user network or internet provider can disrupt or destroy the connection. Since VoIP requires an internet connection, direct attacks on the internet connection, or provider, can be effective. Such attacks target office telephony. Mobile applications that do not rely on an internet connection to make calls are immune to such attacks.

=== Default security settings ===
VoIP phones are smart devices that need to be configured. In some cases, Chinese manufacturers are using default passwords that lead to vulnerabilities.

=== VOIP over Wi-Fi ===
While VoIP is relatively secure, it still needs a source of internet, which is often a Wi-Fi network, making VoIP subject to Wi-Fi vulnerabilities

=== Packet loss ===
Since VoIP runs over an internet connection, via wired, Wi-Fi or 4G, it is susceptible to packet loss which affects the ability to make and receive calls or makes the calls hard to hear. The susceptibility is due to the real time nature of the communication. Packet loss is the biggest reason for VoIP support calls.

=== SIP ALG ===
When VoIP was first setup, a setting called SIP ALG was added to routers to prevent VoIP Packets being modified. However, on more modern VoIP systems, the SIP ALG router setting causes routing issues with VoIP Packets causing calls to drop. Routers are usually shipped with SIP ALG turned on.

== Exploits ==
=== Spam ===
VoIP is vulnerable to spam, known as SPIT (Spam over Internet Telephony) because it relies on the open internet, which is less regulated. Using the extensions provided by VoIP PBX capabilities, the spammer can harass their target from different numbers. The process can be automated and can fill the target's voice mail with notifications. The spammer can make calls often enough to block the target from getting important calls.

=== Phishing ===
VoIP users can change their Caller ID if they have admin rights on the VoIP server. Anyone who resells VoIP or manages their own VoIP server can allocate any phone number as an outgoing number. This is commonly used for genuinue reasons when a customer is porting a number, so they can use their number of a new platform while the port takes place. But it can be used maliciously to mask any number. (a.k.a. Caller ID spoofing), allowing a caller to pose as a relative or colleague in order to extract information, money or benefits from the target.

== See also ==
- Comparison of VoIP software
- INVITE of Death
- List of VoIP companies
- Mobile communications over IP - Mobile VoIP
- Voice over WLAN - VoIP over a WiFi network
