= Operation PowerOFF =

Joint operation to close DDoS websites

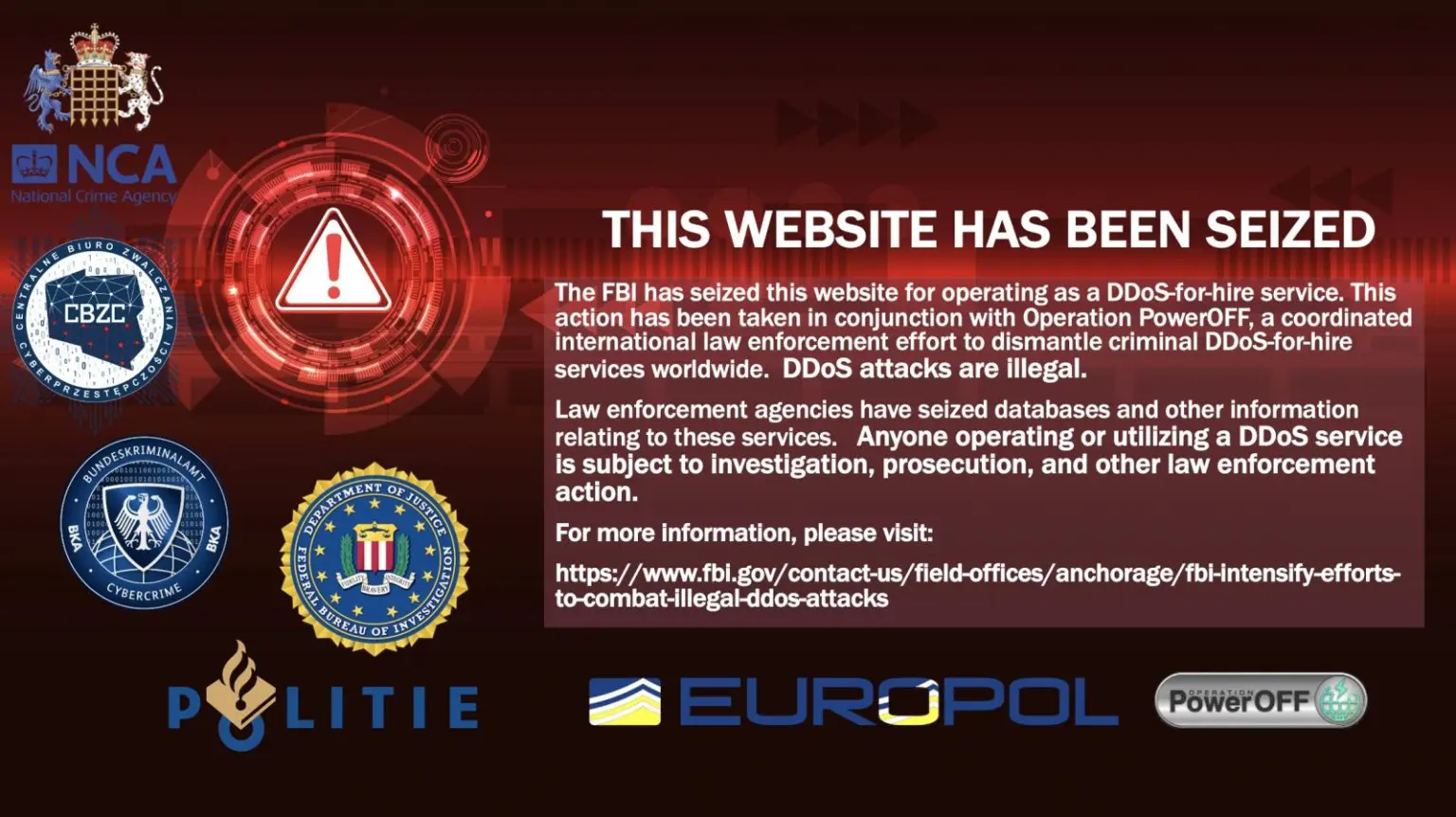
Seizure message placed on DDoS websites after raid

Operation PowerOFF is an ongoing joint operation by the FBI, EUROPOL, the Dutch National Police Corps, German Federal Criminal Police Office, Poland Cybercrime Police and the UK National Crime Agency to close "booter/stresser" services offering DDoS attack services for hire. Beginning in 2018, the operation shut down 48 websites offering DDoS services, and six people were arrested in the United States. Multiple companies, including Cloudflare, PayPal, and DigitalOcean provided information to the FBI to assist in the seizure.

== History ==
In 2018, the FBI closed down 15 DDoS websites with the Dutch National Police Corps. On December 14, 2022, resuming this collaboration, the FBI and Department of Justice announced that they had closed multiple websites offering DDoS-for-hire services. The FBI claimed that these websites offered services designed to slow down websites relating to gaming. The FBI also noted that these services had heavy use, claiming that "Quantum", one of the seized services, was used to launch 50,000 attacks. After the shutdown, multiple law enforcement agencies collaborating with the FBI declared they would place advertisements on search engines, such as Google, that would educate the public on the legality of DDoS services.

== Aftermath ==
Six US citizens were indicted by FBI offices in California and Alaska. Three of the people arrested were from Florida, one from Texas, one from Hawaii, and one from New York. The FBI asks that users with information related to the attacks contact their offices for tips and information related to the seized sites.

== Ongoing activity ==
In December 2024 a Europol-coordinated action involving 15 countries led to three website administrators being arrested in France and Germany. Authorities also seized 27 DDoS-for-hire platforms. As of May 2025, Operation PowerOFF activities are still ongoing, with further websites being seized, prosecutions continuing, and 21 countries joining the operation. In April 2026 an action week involving more than 20 countries resulted in four arrests and the execution of 25 search warrants, according to Europol. More than 50 domains were seized. European authorities reported identifying about 75,000 people who had used the services.
