= Resource exhaustion attack =

Exploit to computer security

Resource exhaustion attacks are computer security exploits that crash, hang, or otherwise interfere with the targeted program or system. They are a form of denial-of-service attack but are different from distributed denial-of-service attacks, which involve overwhelming a network host such as a web server with requests from many locations.

== Attack vectors ==
Resource exhaustion attacks generally exploit a software bug or design deficiency. In software with manual memory management (most commonly written in C or C++), memory leaks are a very common bug exploited for resource exhaustion. Even if a garbage collected programming language is used, resource exhaustion attacks are possible if the program uses memory inefficiently and does not impose limits on the amount of state used when necessary.

File descriptor leaks are another common vector. Most general-purpose programming languages require the programmer to explicitly close file descriptors, so even particularly high-level languages allow the programmer to make such mistakes.

== Types and examples ==
- Billion laughs
- Fork bomb
- Infinite loop
- Local Area Network Denial (LAND)
- Pentium F00F bug
- Ping of death
- Regular expression denial of service (ReDoS)
