= Pavlo Chabanov =

- Павлó Чабáнов
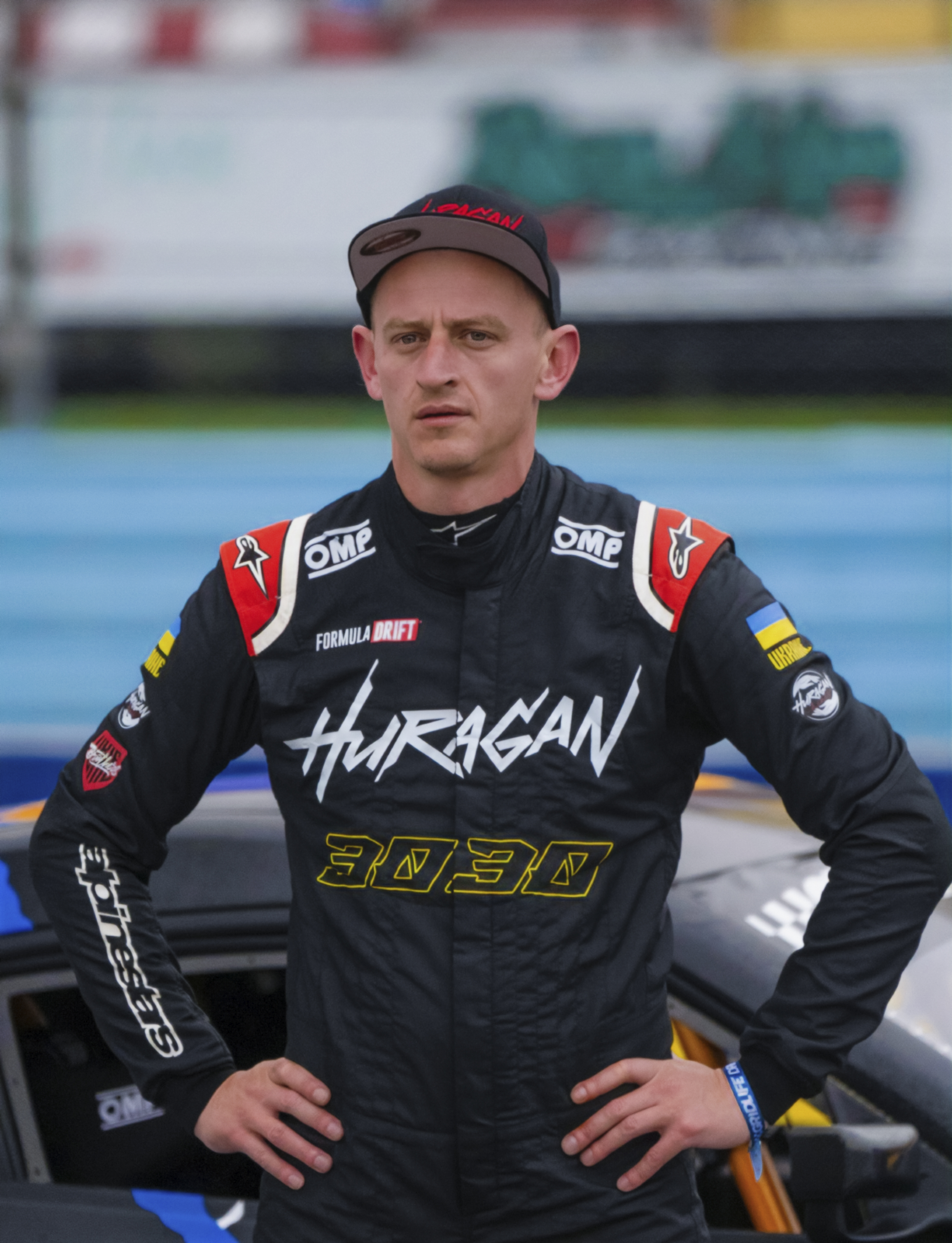
- Chabanov at the 2023 Gridlife (festival)
- Born: July 2, 1986 (age 40); Simferopol, Crimea, Ukrainian SSR (Soviet Union)
- Occupations: • Professional drifter and circuit racing driver • IT entrepreneur • Developer • Startupper • Investor • Philanthropist
- Known for: Being the first Ukrainian to represent the country in the TCR class at the FIA Motorsport Games. Founding of Huragan, Ukraine’s first racing team, which took part in the Formula Drift Pro Championship.
- Title: Founder of Huragan racing team; Founder, CEO of Gliesereum Ukraine; Founder, CTO of Stels
- Website: gliesereum.com stels.io

Pavlo Chabanov (born July 2, 1986) is a Ukrainian motorsport athlete, IT entrepreneur, developer, startupper, investor, and philanthropist. He is an FIA-accredited circuit and drift driver, owner of the Huragan racing team, and co-founder of the humanitarian foundation Huragan Heals.

Chabanov is best known for being the first Ukrainian professional racing driver to represent the country in the TCR class at the FIA Motorsport Games in 2022, held in Marseille. He also founded Huragan, Ukraine's first racing team, which took part in the Formula Drift Pro Championship in 2023.

Chabanov is the founder of the blockchain network Gliesereum and the CEO of the IT company Gliesereum Ukraine. He specializes in cybersecurity, neural networks, and big data.

== Business career ==
In 2010, Chabanov joined the BTC development community, deploying 45 technology nodes within a few months. He earned his first bitcoins as a reward for supporting the system.

Since 2019 Chabanov's entrepreneurial and innovative career has been closely associated with Gliesereum Ukraine, blockchain network Gliesereum and various startups.

Chabanov has been a speaker at creative meetups in Kyiv, sharing his experiences as a startup founder and businessman.

Chabanov has also commented in the Ukrainian press on topics such as the creation of the national CBDC (e-hryvnia), the legal regulation of the virtual assets market, and cybersecurity.

In 2022, at the Web Summit in Lisbon, Chabanov presented his new startup, Simia, an audio and video P2P platform.

Chabanov is included in the "40 Under 40 Notable Blockchain Entrepreneurs" ranking as the founder of Gliesereum Ukraine, Simia, and one of Europe's largest crypto liquidity providers. Chabanov is also known for creating automated market-making systems used by the top-10 global crypto exchanges.

== Motorsport career ==
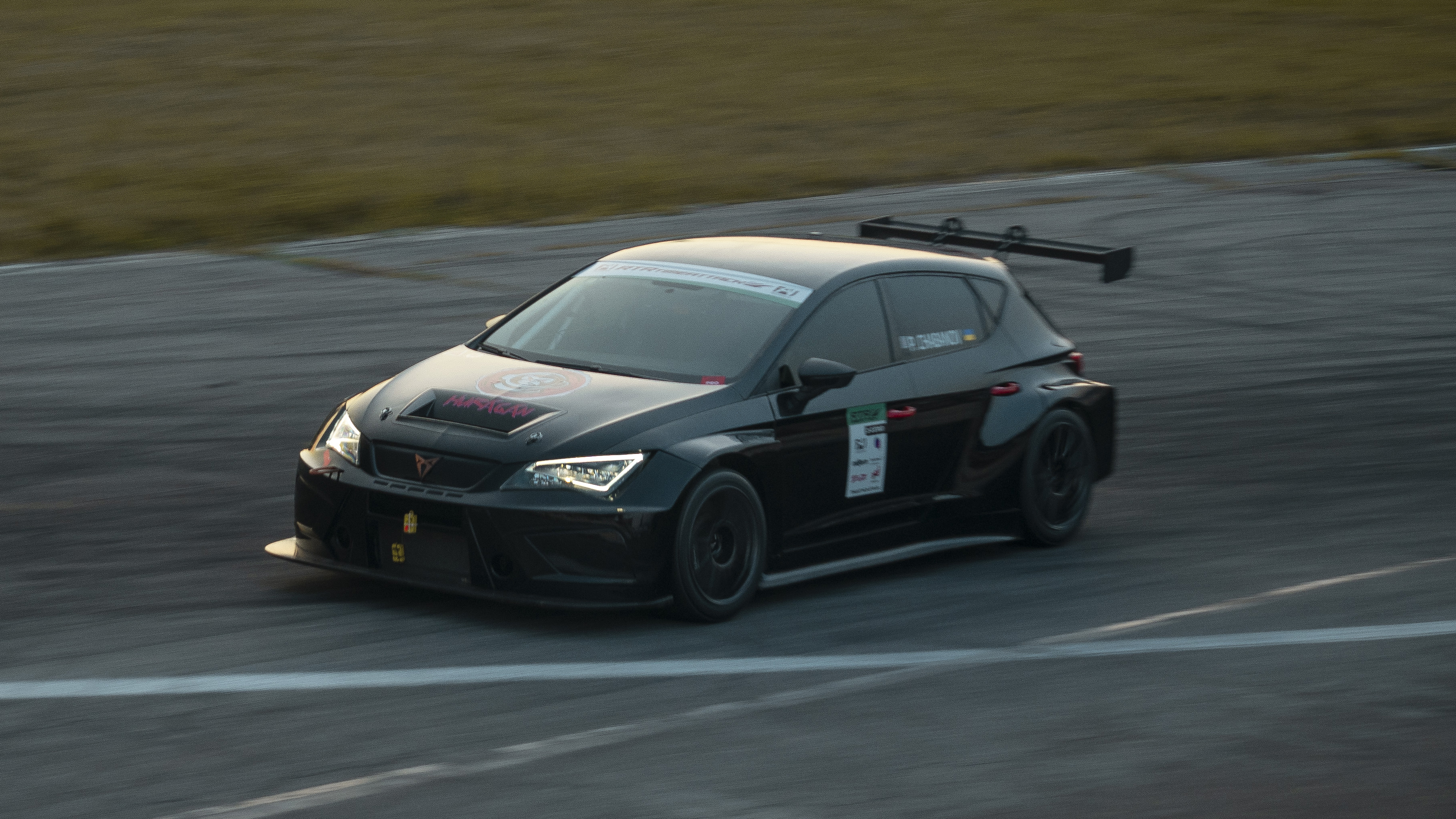
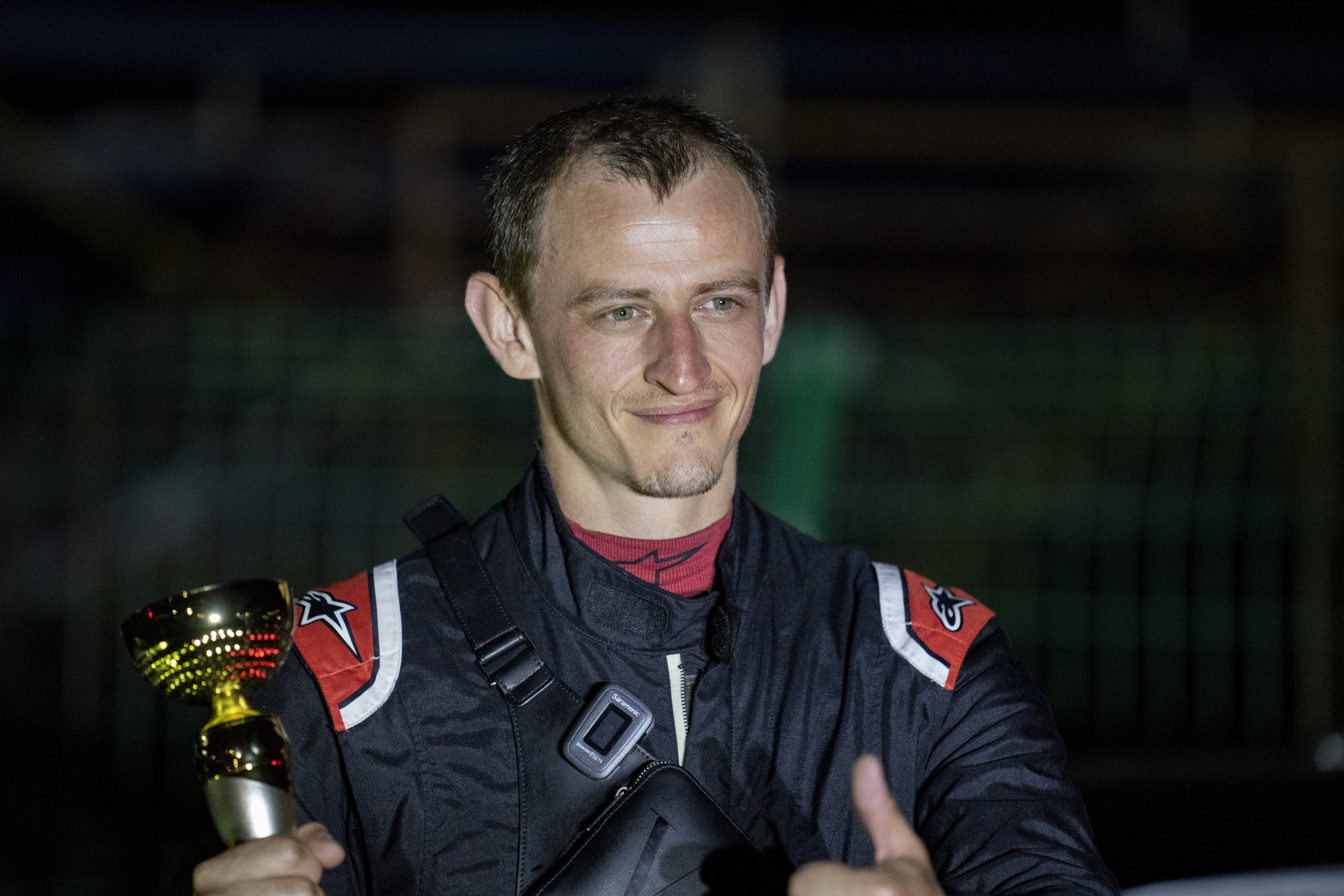
Pavlo Chabanov on Seat Leon Cupra and with his 2nd place trophy in 2021.

Chabanov began his motorsport career in 2021, competing in three disciplines: circuit racing (Touring), drifting (Pro-Am/Pro), and time attack (R2 Pro). He founded the Huragan racing team.

Chabanov brought Ukraine its first TCR car, the Seat Leon Cupra, marking a milestone in the country's motorsport history. He competed in several racing series, and took 2nd place in the 4rd round of the Ukrainian Circuit Racing Cup, Touring Car Racing.

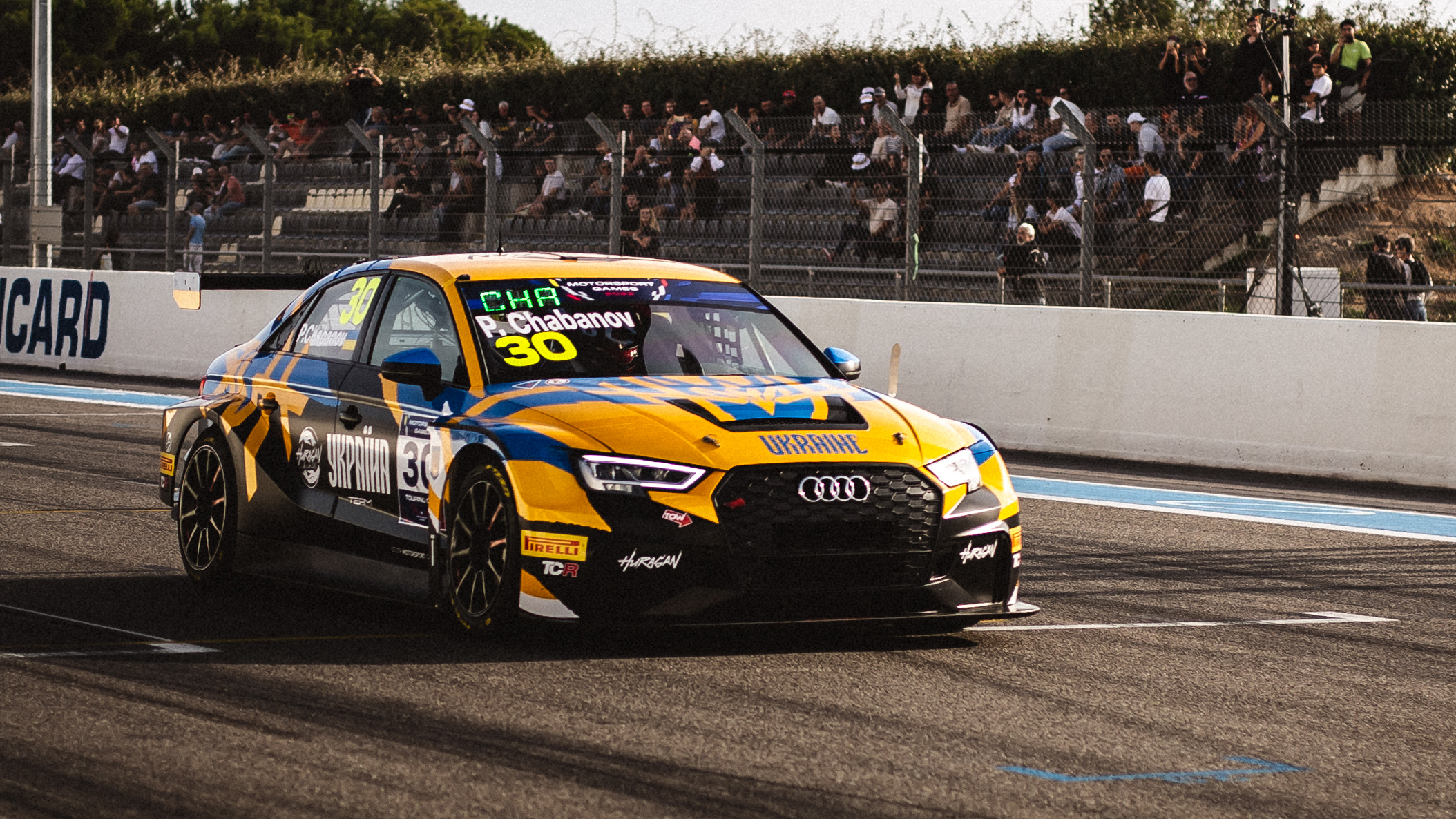
Pavlo on Audi RS3 LMS TCR at Circuit Paul Ricard, 2022.

Pavlo Chabanov started his preparations for the Formula Drift Pro Championship in 2021.

In 2022 — during the year when the Russian full-scale invasion of Ukraine began — Chabanov was selected for the national motorsport team.

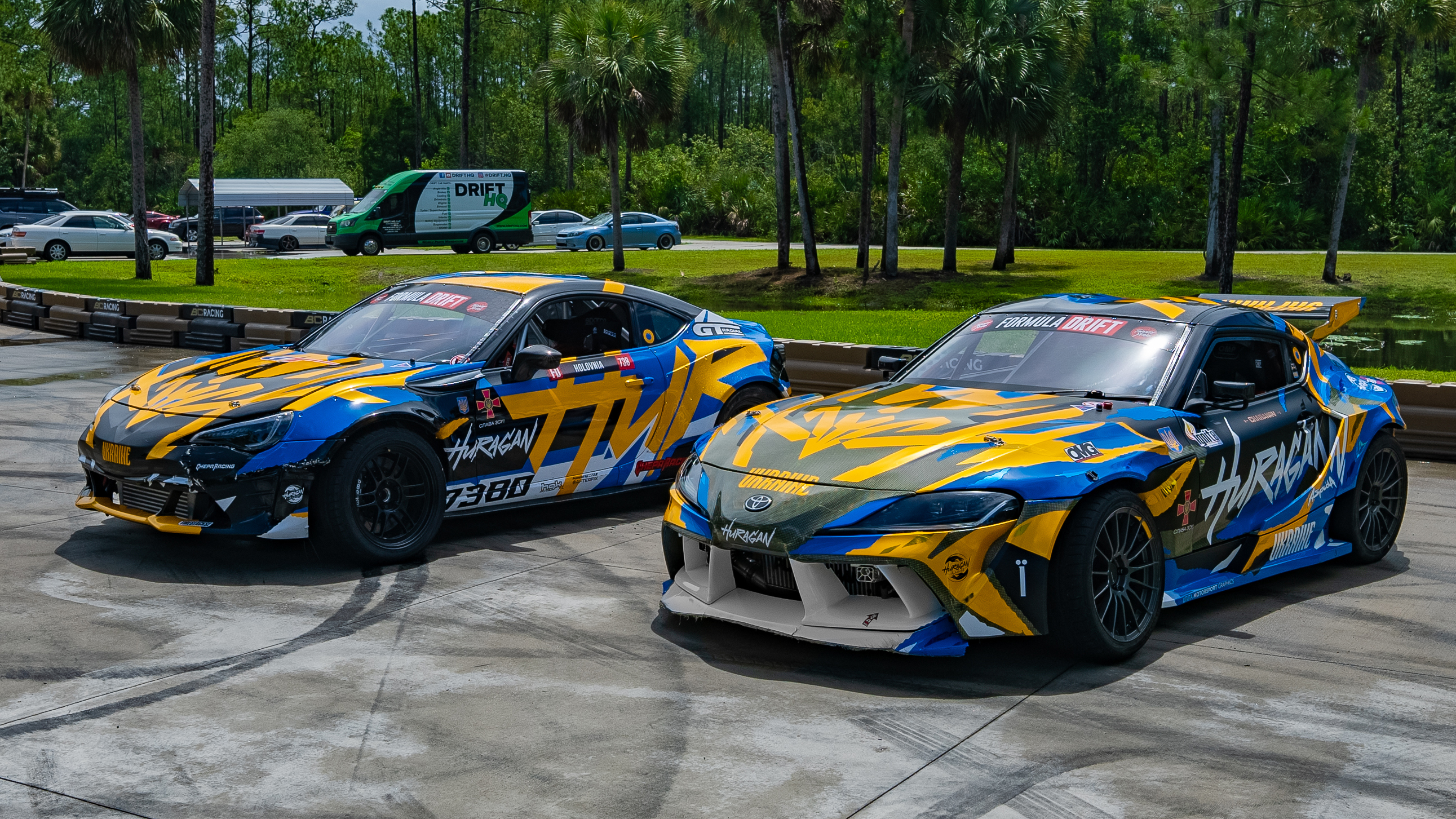
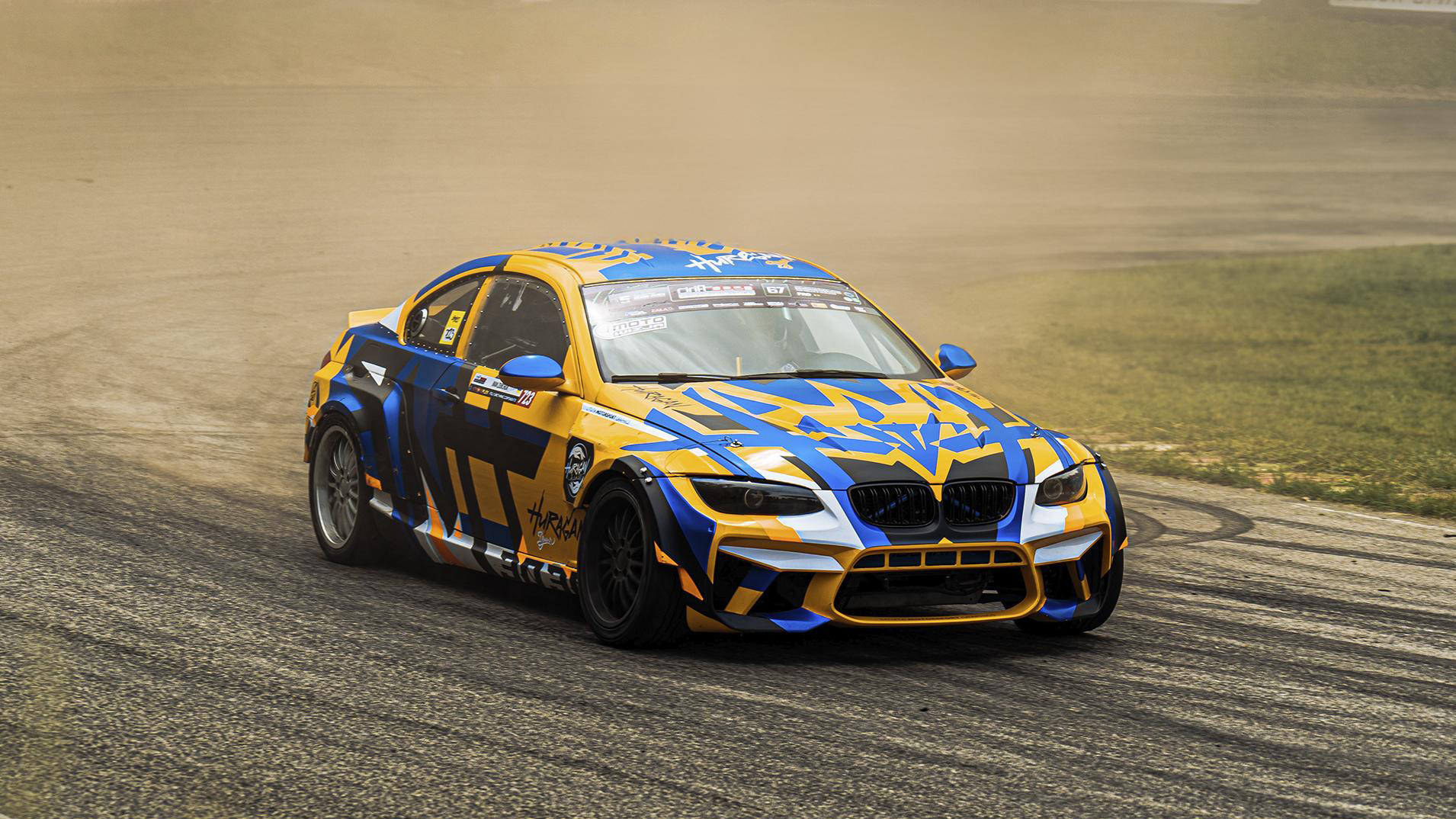
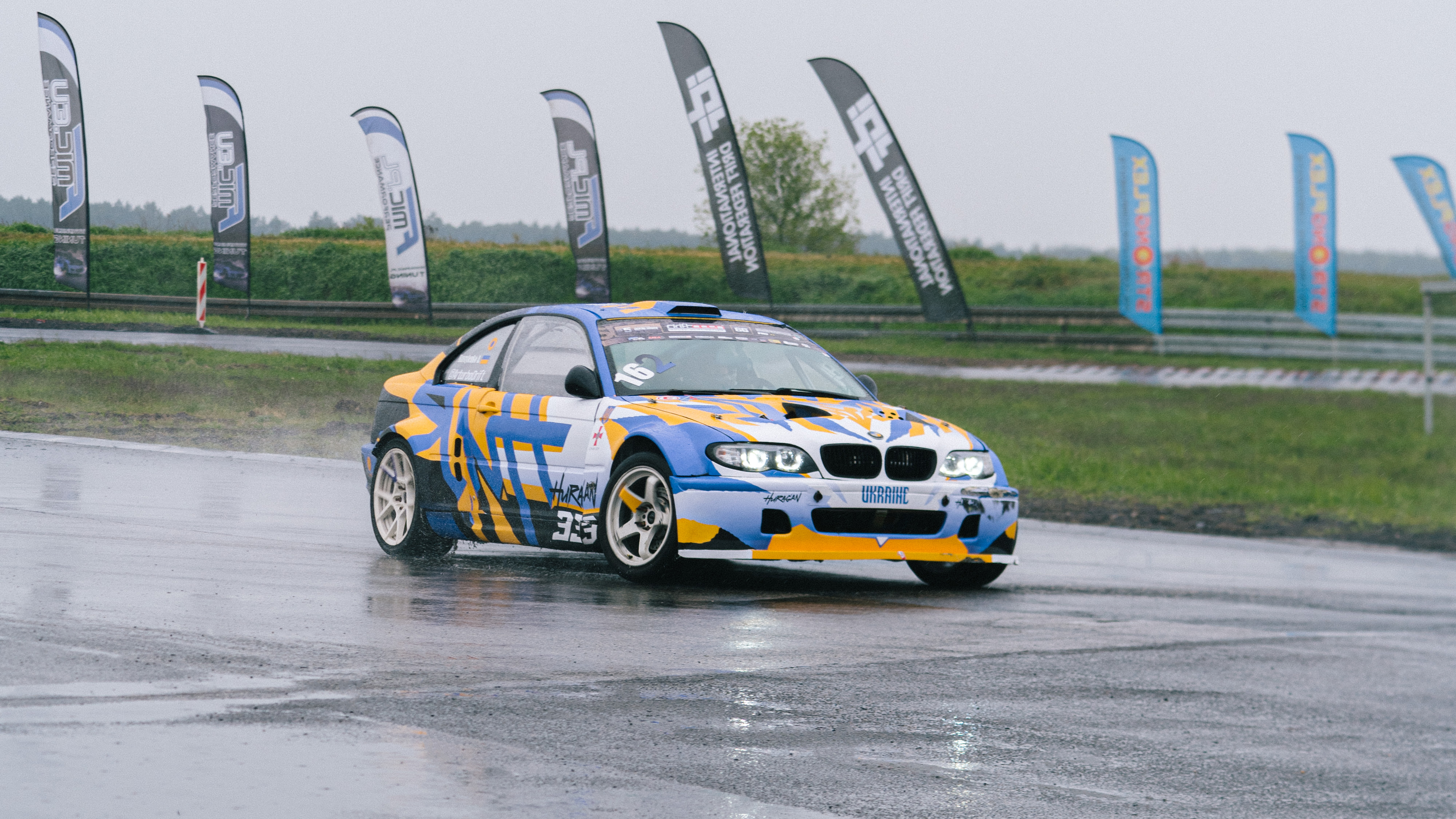
Huragan team cars in the US and Europe during the 2023 "Battle On Two Continents" World Racing Tour.

From October 29–31, Chabanov made history as the first Ukrainian in the TCR class at the FIA Motorsport Games, held at Circuit Paul Ricard. Chabanov competed in an Audi RS3 LMS TCR.

Throughout the 2022–2023 seasons, the Huragan racing team's cars were wrapped in Ukrainian-themed liveries featuring blue and yellow colors, and the trident.

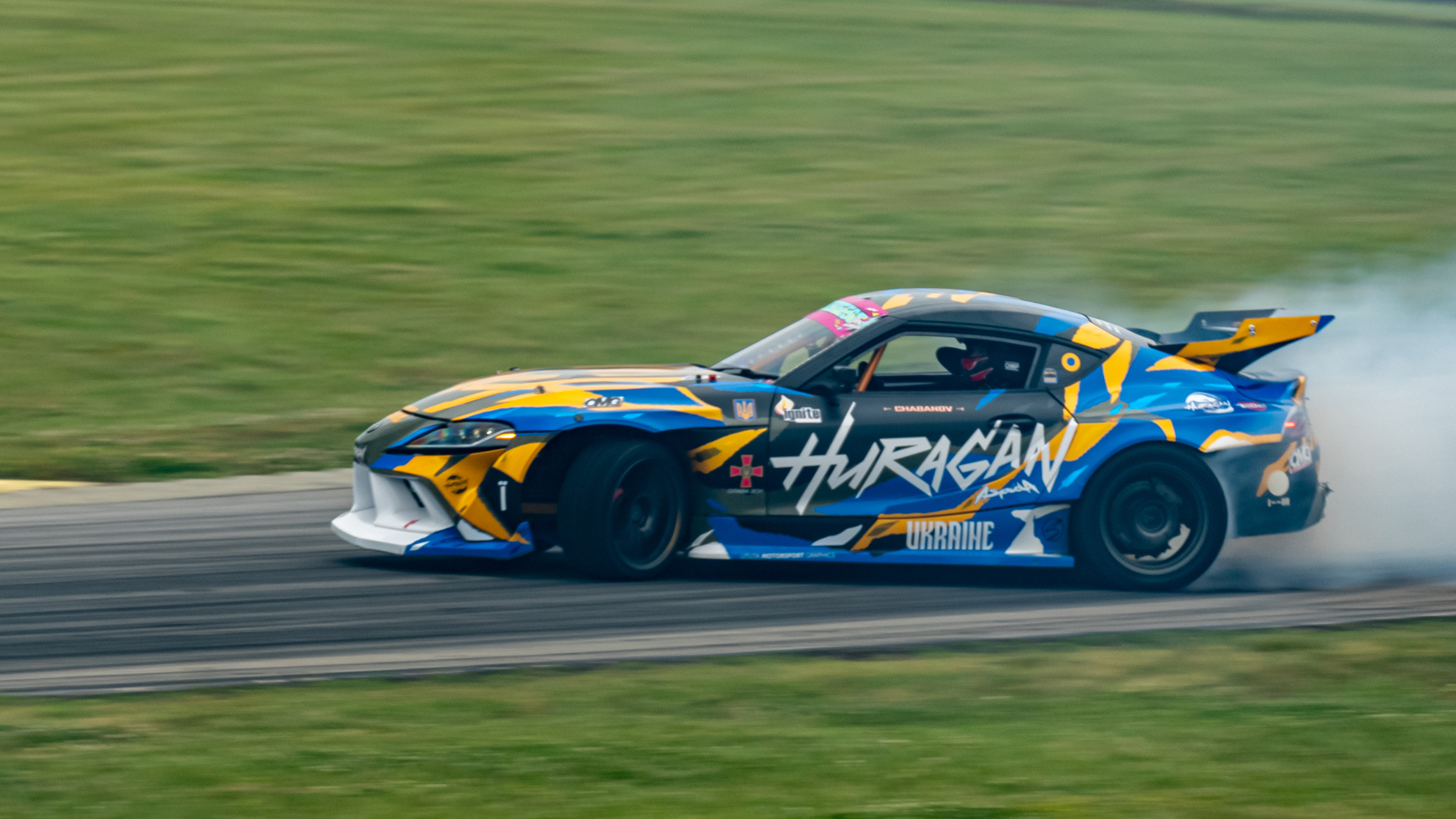
Chabanov running Toyota Supra A90 “Aspida” at the 2023 Hyperfest, Virginia International Raceway.

In 2023, Huragan became the first Ukrainian team to compete in the Formula Drift Pro Championship. The team raced with the Toyota Supra A90 “Aspida” and the Toyota GT86.

As part of the 2023 "Battle On Two Continents" World Racing Tour, the team participated in three rounds of Formula Drift: Long Beach, Atlanta, and Orlando, as well as various American and European racing series, including Gridlife, HyperFest, FuelFest, HotPit AutoFest, Drift Kings, and Drift Open.

== Racing record ==
=== RTR Time Attack Ukraine's National Racing Series results ===
Season	Round	Team	Race track	Class	Car	Best time	Podiums	Pts	Pos.	Points total	Overall standings
2021	1	Huragan	Autodrome Chaika	Club Sport S1	Volkswagen Golf GTI	1:27.385	0	8	6	48	3rd
2021	2	Huragan	Autodrome Chaika	PRO R 2	CUPRA León TCR	1:28.834	1	18	2	48	3rd
2021	3	Huragan	Autodrome Chaika	PRO R 2	CUPRA León TCR	1:32.427	1	18	3	48	3rd
2021	4	Huragan	Autodrome Chaika	PRO R 2	CUPRA León TCR	1:24.247	0	12	4	48	3rd

=== Ukrainian Circuit Racing Cup results ===
Season	Round	Team	Race track	Class	Car	Podiums	Points	Position
2021	2	Huragan	Autodrome Chaika	Super Touring	CUPRA León TCR	0	10	9
2021	4	Huragan	Autodrome Chaika	Super Touring	CUPRA León TCR	1	22.5	2

=== Chaika Circuit Racing Cup results ===
Season	Round	Team	Race track	Class	Car	Podiums	Points	Position
2021	2	Huragan	Autodrome Chaika	Super Touring	CUPRA León TCR	0	10	4
2021	3	Huragan	Autodrome Chaika	Super Touring	CUPRA León TCR	0	15	4

=== Bitlook Ukraine's National Pro-Am Drift Series results ===
Season	Round	Team	Race track / City	Car
2021	2	Huragan	Lviv	BMW e30 "Bit[OK]"
2021	3	Huragan	Autodrome Chaika	BMW z4
2021	4	Huragan	Odesa	BMW z4

=== VEZEM Drift Games Ukraine's Pro-Am Drift Series results ===
Season	Round	Team	Race track / City	Car	Best finish
2021	3	Huragan	NoMotors Drift Base, Kyiv	BMW z4	Top-24
2021	4	Huragan	NoMotors Drift Base, Kyiv	BMW z4	Top-24

=== PRO Drift Competitions of Ukraine results ===
Season	Event	Team	Race track	Car	Best finish
2021	United Drift Challenge	Huragan	Autodrome Chaika	BMW e30	Top-32
2021	RTR Drift Attack	Huragan	Autodrome Chaika	BMW e30	-

=== FIA Motorsport Games Touring Car Cup results ===
Season	Team	Cup	Race track	Car	Qualifying, Best time	Quali race, Best time	Main race, Best time
2022	🇺🇦 Team Ukraine	TCR Touring Car	Circuit Paul Ricard	Audi RS3 LMS TCR	18th, 2:19.767	-	14th, 1:38.142

Pavlo Chabanov is featured in the TCR World Ranking.

=== US motorsports festivals: Drifting ===
Season	Event	Team	Race track	Car
2023	Gridlife At The Glen	Huragan	Watkins Glen International	Toyota Supra A90 “Aspida”
2023	HyperFest	Huragan	Virginia International Raceway	Toyota Supra A90 “Aspida”
2023	FuelFest	Huragan	Irwindale Speedway	Toyota Supra A90 “Aspida”

=== HotPit AutoFest Drift Series results ===
HotPit AutoFest is a Western USA Pro/Semi-Pro drift series supported by Formula Drift.
Season	Round	Team	Race track	Car	Best finish
2023	3	Huragan	Orange Show Speedway	Toyota Supra A90 “Aspida”	Top-32
2023	4	Huragan	Orange Show Speedway	Toyota Supra A90 “Aspida”	Top-16
2023	5	Huragan	Orange Show Speedway	Toyota Supra A90 “Aspida”	Top-32

== See also ==
- Ukraine
- Motorsport
- Fédération Internationale de l'Automobile
- Drifting (motorsport)
- Auto racing
- 2022 FIA Motorsport Games Touring Car Cup
- Athletes at the 2022 FIA Motorsport Games
- 2022 FIA Motorsport Games
- Blockchain
- Market making
- Neural networks
- Big data
- Cybersecurity
- Bitcoin (BTC)
- Startup company
- History of CBDCs by country
- Web Summit
- Crypto exchange
- Touring car racing (TCR)
- Formula Drift
- Russian invasion of Ukraine
- Russo-Ukrainian War
- Circuit Paul Ricard
- Audi RS3 LMS TCR
- Coat of arms of Ukraine
- Toyota Supra A90
- Toyota GT86
- Gridlife Motorsports Festival
- Autodrome Chaika
- Volkswagen Golf GTI
- CUPRA León TCR
- BMW e30
- BMW z4
- TCR World Ranking
- Watkins Glen International
- Virginia International Raceway
- Irwindale Speedway
- Orange Show Speedway
- Toyota Supra A90
