= Chris Pile (programmer) =

British computer programmer

Christopher Pile
- Born: 1968 or 1969 (age 56–57)
- Occupation: Programmer
- Known for: Created the computer viruses 'Pathogen' and 'Queeg'

Christopher Pile (born 1968 or 1969, also known as "the Black Baron") is a programmer who was sentenced, on November 15, 1995, to 18 months in jail for creating and spreading two computer viruses called Pathogen and Queeg. While Pile was not the first person convicted for creating and spreading computer viruses, his case was the first "widely covered and published computer crime case that ended in a jail sentence" as well as the first such case to be prosecuted in England and Wales.

In addition to the two viruses, he also created Smeg (short for "Simulated Metamorphic Encryption enGine"), a software tool that he used to hide Pathogen and Queeg from the antivirus software of the time. Smeg was written in a way that allowed it to be also used by others to hide and spread their own viruses.
