= Delayed binding =

Delayed binding, also called TCP connection splicing, is the postponement of the connection between the client and the server in order to obtain sufficient information to make a routing decision. Some application switches and routers delay binding the client session to the server until the proper handshakes are complete so as to prevent denial-of-service attacks.
