= Ping of death =

Attack on a computer system by pinging a computer

A ping of death is a type of cyberattack on a computer system that involves sending a malformed or otherwise malicious ICMP echo request, a message normally associated with the ping utility, to a computer. In this attack, a host sends hundreds of ICMP echo requests with a packet size that is large or illegal to try to take the receiving host offline or to keep it preoccupied responding with replies.

A correctly formed ICMP echo request is typically 56 bytes in size, or 64 bytes when the Internet Control Message Protocol (ICMP) header is considered, and 84 bytes including Internet Protocol (IP) version 4 header. However, any IPv4 packet may be as large as 65,535 bytes. Some computer systems were never designed to properly handle an ICMP echo request packet larger than the maximum packet size because it violates the Internet Protocol. Like other large but well-formed packets, a ping of death is fragmented into groups of 8 octets before transmission. However, when the target computer reassembles the malformed packet, a buffer overflow can occur, causing a system crash and potentially allowing the injection of malicious code.

In early implementations of TCP/IP, this bug is easy to exploit and could affect a wide variety of systems, including Unix, Linux, Mac, Windows, and peripheral devices. As systems began filtering out pings of death through firewalls and other detection methods, a different form of ping attack known as ping flooding later appeared, which floods the victim with so many ping requests that normal traffic fails to reach the system. This form is a basic denial-of-service attack.

The ping of death attack has been largely neutralized by advancements in technology. Devices produced after 1998 include defenses against such attacks, rendering them resilient to this specific threat. However, in a notable development, a variant targeting IPv6 packets on Windows systems was identified, leading Microsoft to release a patch in mid-2013.

== Detailed information ==
The maximum packet length of an IPv4 packet, including the IP header, is 65,535 (2^{16} − 1) bytes, a limitation presented by the use of a 16-bit wide Length field in the IP header that describes the total packet length. The underlying data link layer typically poses a lower limit to the maximum frame size (see MTU). In Ethernet, this is typically 1500 bytes. In such a case, a large IP payload is split across multiple IP packets, known as IP fragments, so that each IP fragment does not exceed the imposed limit. The receiver of the IP fragments will reassemble them into the complete IP packet and continue processing it as usual.

When fragmentation is performed, each IP fragment needs to carry information about which part of the original IP packet it contains. This information is kept in the Fragment Offset field in the IP header. The field is 13 bits long and contains the offset of the data in the current IP fragment, in the original IP packet. The offset is given in units of 8 bytes. This allows a maximum offset of 65,528 ((2^{13} − 1) × 8). Then, adding 20 bytes of IP header, the maximum is 65,548 bytes, which exceeds the maximum packet size. A malicious user can send an invalid IP fragment offset exceeding the maximum IPv4 packet length. When the receiver reassembles a transmission with such an invalid offset, it will end up with an IP packet that is larger than the maximum allowed 65,535 bytes. Reassembly of such a packet may overflow memory buffers the receiver allocated for the packet, and can cause various problems.

As is evident from the description above, the problem not specific to ICMP, which is used only as a payload big enough to exploit the problem. It is a problem in the reassembly process of IP fragments, which may contain any type of protocol (TCP, UDP, IGMP, etc.).

The correction of the problem is to add checks in the reassembly process. The check for each incoming IP fragment makes sure that the sum of Fragment Offset and Total Length fields in the IP header of each IP fragment is smaller than or equal to 65,535. If the sum is greater, then the packet is invalid, and the IP fragment is ignored. This check is performed by some firewalls, to protect hosts that do not have the bug fixed.

=== IPv6 ===
In 2013, an IPv6 version of the ping of death vulnerability was discovered in Microsoft Windows. The Windows TCP/IP stack did not handle memory allocation correctly when processing incoming malformed ICMPv6 packets, which could cause remote denial of service. This vulnerability was fixed in MS13-065 in August 2013. The CVE-ID for this vulnerability is CVE-2013-3183.

In 2020, another bug (CVE-2020-16898) in ICMPv6 was found around Router Advertisement, which could even lead to remote code execution.

== See also ==
- INVITE of Death
- LAND
- ReDoS
- Smurf attack
