= Identity management theory =

Intercultural communication theory

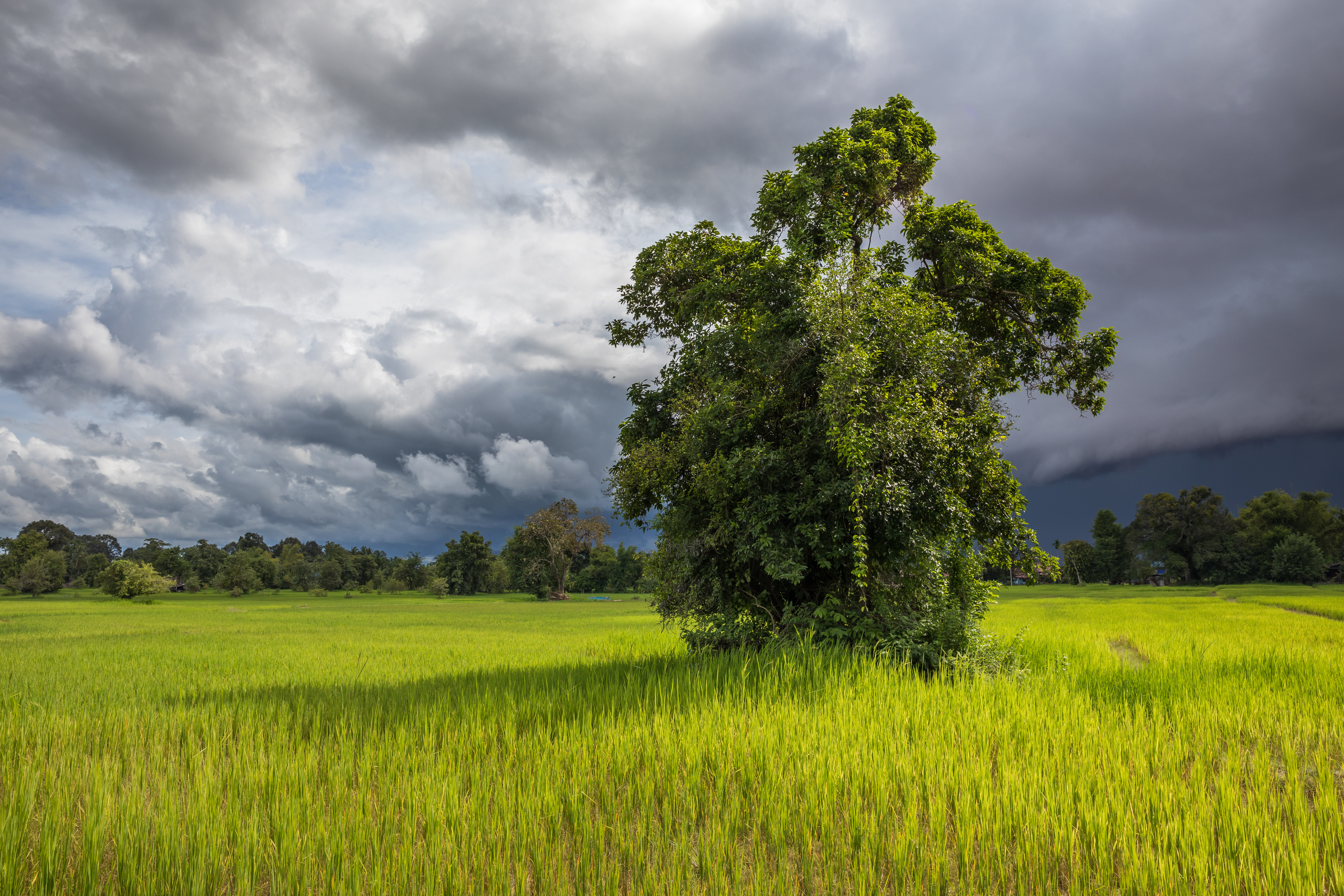

Identity management theory (also frequently referred to as IMT) is an intercultural communication theory from the 1990s. It was developed by William R. Cupach and Tadasu Todd Imahori on the basis of Erving Goffman's Interaction ritual: Essays on face-to-face behavior (1967). Cupach and Imahori distinguish between intercultural communication (speakers from different cultures) and intracultural communication (speakers sharing the same culture).

Identity management theory explores the role of face, negotiation, and identity convergence in regard to intercultural communication. IMT seeks to explain how the development of interpersonal relationships is the means by which cultural identities are negotiated. According to IMT, these cultural identities need to be successfully managed and mutually accepted by individuals.

To understand IMT, it is important to be familiar with Cupach and Imahori's view of identities. Among the multiple identities which an individual possesses, cultural and relational identities are regarded as essential to IMT.

There are two ways of IMT. Cupach and Imahori claim that presenting one's face shows facets of an individual's identity. Whether an interlocuter is able to maintain face or not, reveals his or her interpersonal communication competence. The use of stereotypes in intercultural conversations often results from the ignorance of each other's culture; the application of stereotypes, however, is face threatening. Being able to manage the resulting tensions, is part of intercultural communication competence. For becoming competent in developing intercultural relationships, the following three phases have to be passed:

1. "trial and error": act of looking for similar aspects in certain identities.
2. "mixing up" the communicators' identities to achieve a relational identity acceptable for both participants
3. renegotiating the distinctive cultural identities with the help of the relational identity that was created in phase 2

Cupach and Imahori emphasize the dynamic nature of identity management and that individuals may move through the different aforementioned phases and strategies depending on the situation.

Erving Goffman is an author off of which the originators of IMT based their theory. Goffman was a well-known sociologist and writer and the most cited sociologist from his writings because of what he studied in communication. Among the six essays that make up Goffman's book, the first essay shows an individual's self-image while engaging in communicating with another individual. The author explained that the self-image that is obtained during interacting is not permanent and has a large social influence. The image someone gets in a social setting is than expected for the future. The risk of changing self-image in a social context will alter how the individual feels about oneself. The author was implying that oftentimes the defense mechanism is to retract from showing your self to much in a social setting so others do not see them in a displeasing way. The idea of the identity management theory uses the ideas of Goffman to help establish what the idea behind the theory is trying to get at.

Intercultural versus intracultural communication varies significantly. Intercultural communication is based on a much greater scheme of things. This type of communication refers to a group of people that differ in backgrounds, whether that is religion, ethnic, education, or social backgrounds. Intercultural communication looks at how the world is viewed, how messages are interpreted, and how differing cultures react to situations. On the contrary, intracultural communication discusses how people of the same background interact with one another. It is very important to compare and contrast intercultural communication to understand the similarities and differences.

The last concept to expand on is identity. Identity is directly connected with the identity management theory since it helps define what this theory is trying to explain. Even though identity is a very broad topic, I will discuss personal identity through the lens of the individual, which will then affect its social identity. Identity is said to be the "distinct personality of an individual" identity. Identity can be the view that people hold about themselves. Also, identity is the perception that people hold about themselves in a social setting. Identity has many subtopics that distinguish why this theory is specific and different from other identity theories. Specific characteristics explain how people feel about themselves as an individual and in a social setting.

== Phases ==
Identity management theory (IMT) unfolds as a dynamic framework that comprehensively explores how individuals navigate and present their identities in social interactions. This theory encompasses distinct phases that encapsulate the intricate process of identity negotiation and presentation.

=== Anticipation phase ===
The IMT journey commences with the anticipation phase, where individuals foresee potential identity-related challenges in forthcoming interactions. This phase involves the anticipation of potential threats to one's identity and the strategic planning of communication to mitigate these threats. By anticipating possible identity challenges, individuals can prepare themselves for effective identity management strategies.

=== Interaction phase ===
As individuals engage in social interactions, the interaction phase of IMT comes into play. This phase involves the actual implementation of identity management strategies based on the anticipated challenges. The tactics employed during this phase can be individual or collective, emphasizing distinctiveness or affiliation with specific social groups. The interaction phase is a crucial period where individuals actively shape their identity based on the social context and the perceived identity needs.

=== Retrospection phase ===
Following social interactions, individuals enter the retrospection phase of IMT. During this phase, individuals reflect on the effectiveness of their identity management strategies and the outcomes of their interactions. Retrospection allows individuals to assess the impact of their chosen strategies on their perceived identity and the perceptions of others.

=== Adaptation phase ===
The adaptation phase is characterized by the adjustment of identity management strategies based on the feedback and outcomes from previous interactions. Individuals may refine their strategies to better align with their identity goals or adjust based on the evolving social context.

=== Termination phase ===
The IMT process culminates in the termination phase, where individuals conclude their identity management efforts in a particular social interaction or context. The termination phase involves a reflection on the overall success or challenges faced during the identity management process.

These phases collectively illustrate the cyclical and iterative nature of IMT, highlighting its utility in understanding the complexities of identity dynamics across various social contexts. Each phase contributes to the overarching goal of aligning one's projected identity with personal and social expectations.

Identity management theory provides a comprehensive lens through which individuals navigate the intricate process of identity negotiation. The phases of anticipation, interaction, retrospection, adaptation, and termination offer a systematic understanding of how individuals strategically manage their identities in the ever-evolving landscape of social interactions.

== Application ==
Identity management theory can be applied not only to the context of intercultural communication but more specifically the context of intercultural friendships.

In one study, identity management theory was used by researchers to reveal the stages and transitions that explain how the process of relational identity formation works in intercultural friendships. To conduct the research, the study took 15 intercultural friendship dyads and conducted the research through interviews. In this study, three stages and two transition periods were found from the intercultural friendships of the research.

=== Initial encounter stage ===
The first stage is the initial encounter. This is when intercultural friends meet for the first time, clarify cultural misunderstandings, and make small talk. In order to reach the next stage, intercultural friends must go through the needs/interests transition period.

=== Needs/interests transition period ===
In the first transition period, needs/interests, there must be needs or interests that motivate a desire to follow through with the friendship such as being a good source of advice or commonality of religious beliefs. The needs/transitions period leads to the interaction stage.

=== Interaction stage ===
In the interaction stage, intercultural friends begin interacting with each other much more daily. In this stage, intercultural friends become more familiar with each other's daily lives and personalities, engage in frequent contact, and begin to build a shared relational identity with one another. Interviewees explained that they learned more about each other's different cultures, contributing to that shared relational identity. Another transition period occurred after this.

=== Turning point period ===
The second transition period is the turning point period. Interviewees explained that though their intercultural friendships progressed throughout the frequent contact of the interaction stage, there was one defining moment that pushed their intercultural friendship to the next stages. General examples of these moments could be staying over each other's home, taking a trip together for the first time, or meeting each other's families for the first times. An Argentinian interviewee named Betty described her turning point period with her American friend Brent being when Brent began calling her on the phone for the first time instead of emailing her. For Betty, this defining moment was a turning point in their intercultural friendship because it was out of the norm for her culture, but it made her feel much closer to Brent.

=== Involvement stage ===
The last stage that researchers of this study found was the involvement stage. In this involvement stage interviewees better understood their role and the rules within their intercultural friendships. They found that they could better understand what was and was not appropriate of them in their friendship. Interviewees Jean and Akiko explained an unspoken rule they understood within their friendship. Akiko, Japanese, is more comfortable with driving than Jean, Chinese, is. It was silently understood by them that Akiko would drive most of the time. Occasionally Akiko would ask Jean to drive and she would agree to, but it was a silent rule between them that Akiko would always drive on long trips. This stage of involvement describes how intercultural friendships can progress to the point that members become more involved and ingrained in each other's lives, leading them to see their friendship as a lifetime commitment. This stage also leads members to a deeper understanding and appreciation for each other's differing cultures.

Through this study, researchers uncovered the stages and transition periods that explain how relational identity is formed. This study parallels the phases of identity management theory relating to the basis of IMT: intercultural communication. Through IMT, it can be asserted that in intercultural friendships, identities are not only formed but are also managed as intercultural friendships progress and the identities of the members become more defined.

== Criticism ==
Despite its influential contributions, IMT has its flaws, with scholars raising criticisms that question certain aspects of its theoretical underpinnings.

=== Overemphasis on rational decision-making ===
One critique contends that IMT places an excessive emphasis on rational decision-making in identity management. Critics argue that this inclination may overlook the emotional and spontaneous dimensions inherent in identity negotiation, potentially oversimplifying the intricate nature of human behavior within social contexts.

=== Cultural limitations ===
The cultural applicability of IMT has been a subject of criticism. Originating in Western cultural contexts, IMT may not fully encapsulate the nuances of identity management in non-Western or collectivist cultures. Cultural variations in identity negotiation strategies may challenge the generalizability of IMT across diverse cultural landscapes.

=== Limited attention to power dynamics ===
Another criticism centers around the perceived oversight of power dynamics within IMT. Critics argue that the theory may not adequately address how power imbalances influence identity negotiation, particularly in situations where one party holds more influence or control over the interaction.

=== Static nature of phases ===
IMT's representation of identity management phases has been criticized for its relatively static nature. Critics posit that these phases may not capture the fluid and dynamic reality of identity negotiation, where individuals continuously adapt to the evolving dynamics of social contexts.

=== Individual-centric focus ===
The predominant focus on individual identity management strategies within IMT has faced scrutiny. Critics argue that the theory may not sufficiently account for collective or group-based identity dynamics, which can be pivotal in certain social interactions.

=== Limited exploration of online identities ===
Given the rapid evolution of communication technologies, IMT has been criticized for its limited exploration of online identities. The theory, developed before the prevalence of social media, may not fully encompass the complexities of virtual identity negotiation in contemporary online spaces.

These criticisms, grounded in diverse perspectives and scholarly insights, prompt a reflection on the strengths and limitations of identity management theory. While IMT provides valuable frameworks for understanding identity negotiation, acknowledging these critiques is essential for refining the theory and enhancing its applicability across diverse social contexts.

== See also ==
- cf. Identity management
