= Smeg Virus Construction Kit =

Computer virus creator

The Smeg Virus Construction Kit (or SMEG) is a polymorphic engine written by virus writer Chris Pile, known as The Black Baron. SMEG is an acronym for Simulated Metamorphic Encryption Generator. Messages within the two viruses Pile created with it, SMEG.Pathogen and SMEG.Queeg, suggest that it is also an allusion to the word smeg, used as a profanity by characters in the British TV series Red Dwarf. The engine is designed to be used to add polymorphism to viruses.

In 1995, Pile was sentenced to 18 months in prison for creating the viruses, becoming the first person convicted under the Computer Misuse Act.

== See also ==
- Timeline of notable computer viruses and worms
- Computer viruses
- Polymorphic code
- Virus Creation Laboratory
