= Mangled packet =

In computer networking, a mangled or invalid packet is a packet—especially IP packet—that either lacks order or self-coherence, or contains code aimed to confuse or disrupt computers, firewalls, routers, or any service present on the network.

Their usage is associated with a type of network attack called a denial-of-service (DoS) attack. They aim to destabilize the network and sometimes to reveal its available services—when network operators must restart the disabled ones. Mangled packets can be generated by dedicated software such as nmap.

As of 2008, most invalid packets are easily filtered by modern stateful firewalls.
