= Virus Creation Laboratory =

Early computer virus creation tool

- VCL Title Screen in Windows Vista
- Developer: Nowhere Man
- Stable release: 1.0 / July 5, 1992
- Operating system: MS-DOS
- Type: Virus creation
- License: Freeware

The Virus Creation Laboratory (VCL) was one of the earliest attempts to provide a virus creation tool so that individuals with little to no programming expertise could mass-create computer viruses. VCL required a password for access, which was widely published alongside VCL. The password was "Chiba City", a likely reference to the William Gibson novel Neuromancer.

A hacker dubbed "Nowhere Man", of the NuKE hacker group, released the software in July 1992.

However, it was later discovered that viruses created with the Virus Creation Laboratory were often ineffective, as many anti-virus programs of the day caught them easily. Also, many viruses created by the program did not work at all - and often, their source codes could not be compiled, thus rendering the virus program created unusable. Despite its limitations, several viruses created with the program became widespread.
