= Sanfilippo =

Sanfilippo is a surname. Notable people with the surname include:

- Bruno Sanfilippo, musician and producer
- Federica Sanfilippo (born 1990), Italian biathlete
- Frank Sanfilippo (born 1981), American soccer player
- Fred Sanfilippo, executive vice president for health affairs at Emory University
- Jasper Sanfilippo, an American businessman, also associated with the Place de la Musique
- José Sanfilippo (1935–2026), Argentine footballer
- Salvatore Sanfilippo (born 1977), author of Redis and hping, also invented Idle scan
- Sylvester Sanfilippo, an American pediatrician who discovered the Sanfilippo syndrome
- Tom SanFilippo, guitarist for the music group The Vagrants
- Tony SanFilippo, musician who co-produced the album Vagabonds and Hooligans

== See also ==
- Sanfilippo syndrome, a rare disease
- Sanfilippo Place de la Musique, a private museum near Chicago, Illinois
- San Filippo (disambiguation)
