= Crescendo (disambiguation) =

Crescendo is a gradual increase of loudness in music.

Crescendo may also refer to:

== Books ==
- Crescendo, 1958 novel by Phyllis Bentley
- Crescendo, 1998 novel by Mary McCarthy
- Crescendo, 1928 novel by Henry Bellamann
- Crescendo (Fitzpatrick novel), 2010 young adult novel by Becca Fitzpatrick
- Crescendo 1980 novel by Charlotte Lamb

== Computing ==
- Crescendo Communications, a computer networking company that was acquired by Cisco in the 1990s
- Crescendo Networks, a company which develops and sells application acceleration devices for data centers

== Film and television ==
- Crescendo (TV series), a Singaporean musical series produced by Wawa Pictures
- Crescendo (1970 film), a British horror film directed by Alan Gibson
- Crescendo (2019 film), a German drama film directed by Dror Zahavi
- Crescendo (2026 film), an upcoming comedy-drama film
- "Crescendo" (Doctors), a 2003 television episode

== Music ==
- Crescendo (awards), an annual music competition dedicated to Afrikaans music
- The Crescendo (music venue)
- The Crescendos, an early rock and roll group
- Crescendo (album), a 1990 album by the Brazilian brock band Ultraje a Rigor
- "Crescendo" (song), a 2026 song by Nmixx
- "Crescendo", a 1990 song by James from the album Gold Mother
- "Crescendo", a 2013 song by Little Boots

== Other uses ==
- Crescendo (heart murmur), used to characterize and classify heart murmurs
- Crescendo (FIRST), the 2024 FIRST Robotics Competition game
