= Valkey =

Open source in-memory key–value database

- Original author: Salvatore Sanfilippo
- Developer: Linux Foundation
- Release: March 28, 2024; 2 years ago
- Stable release: 9.1.3 / October 26, 2026; 19 days ago
- Written in: C
- Operating system: Unix-like
- Available in: English
- Type: Data structure store, key–value database
- License: BSD license
- Website: valkey.io
- Repository: github.com/valkey-io/valkey

Valkey is an open-source in-memory key–value database, used as a distributed cache and message broker, with optional durability. Because it holds all data in memory and because of its design, Valkey offers low-latency reads and writes, making it particularly suitable for use cases that require a cache. Valkey is a fork of Redis, the most popular NoSQL database and one of the most popular databases overall. Valkey and Redis have been used by companies including Twitter, Airbnb, Tinder, Yahoo, Adobe, Hulu, Amazon and OpenAI, and Valkey is supported by Alibaba Cloud, AWS, Ericsson, Google Cloud, Heroku, Oracle, Percona, and Verizon.

Valkey supports different kinds of abstract data structures, such as strings, lists, maps, sets, sorted sets, HyperLogLogs, bitmaps, streams, and spatial indices.

== History ==
Redis was developed and maintained by Salvatore Sanfilippo, starting in 2009. From 2015 until 2020, he led a project core team sponsored by Redis Labs.

In 2018, Redis Ltd., the company managing Redis development, licensed some modules under a modified Apache 2.0 with a Commons Clause.

In 2024, the Redis company switched the licensing for the Redis core code repository from the BSD license to dual SSPL and proprietary licensing. This prompted a large portion of the user and developer community, including contributors from Alibaba Group, Amazon, Ericsson, Google, Huawei and Tencent, to fork the code of Redis 7.2.4 as a project of the Linux Foundation under the new name Valkey, retaining the BSD license. Valkey 8.0, released six months after the fork, featured improved threading and significantly improved performance. On October 21, 2025, the Linux Foundation announced the general availability of Valkey 9.0, which introduced atomic slot migration, hash field expiration, and support for multiple databases in cluster mode, enabling clusters of up to 2,000 nodes and throughput exceeding 1 billion requests per second. Valkey 9.1 followed on May 19, 2026, focusing on compute efficiency and modularity, and introduced Valkey Admin, an open-source visual cluster management tool.

== See also ==
- Conflict-free replicated data type
- Memcached
- Infinispan
