= IRDP =

IRDP can stand for:

- ICMP Router Discovery Protocol
- Independent Radio Drama Productions
- Institute of rural development planning
- Integrated rural development program in 1978-79
- Iraq Research and Documentation Project (2002 - 2003).
