= Windows Update MiniTool =

Freeware application, part of Windows Update

- Developer: stupid user
- Release: 09.09.2015 / (September 9, 2015; 10 years ago)
- Stable release: 22.04.2022 / (April 22, 2022; 4 years ago)
- Written in: C, C++
- Operating system: Windows NT-based operating systems (Note: Ranging from Windows 2000 through 11)
- Platform: IA-32, x86-64
- Available in: 17 languages
- Type: Network service
- License: Freeware
- Website: forum.ru-board.com

Windows Update MiniTool (also called WUMT) is a freeware application created by a Russian programmer by the name of stupid user, and was released in 2015. It is an alternative to Windows Update for the Microsoft Windows operating systems by allowing users to search, install, postpone, and disable updates.

This program interface has been made available in a number of languages (initially: English, Korean, Russian, Spanish; later: Bulgarian, Chinese, Czech, Dutch, French, German, Indonesian, Italian, Japanese, Portuguese, Serbian, Slovak, Turkish). It supports Windows NT-based operating systems in both 32-bit and 64-bit versions.

== Interface and Features ==
The interface is divided into a sidebar that runs the program's function. The options are:

- Query the update server.
- Download selected updates but don't install.
- Download and install selected updates.
- Uninstall selected updates.
- Hide (block) selected updates.
- Copy the information to the clipboard.

WUMT features a modern, bright interface, and so far lacks a dark mode.

== Reception ==
The software received favorable reviews. Softpedia gave it a 4.5/5 with editor, Giorgiana Arghire writing, "If you want to make sure that you do not forget about the postponed updates, you can use Windows Update MiniTool, as it allows you to download and install them when you choose."

== Legacy ==
WUMT gained some notoriety in the early 2020s when Microsoft announced that they would be discontinuing the Windows Update service's SHA-1 endpoints for older versions of Windows (which included Windows 2000, Windows XP, Windows Server 2003, and Windows Vista) that year, citing weaknesses with the SHA-1 hashing algorithm as well as complying with newer industry standards. Due to it, older operating systems could no longer receive updates via the Windows Update server, prompting users to use the WUMT tool (alongside other methods such as Legacy Update) in order to get automatic updates working again.
