= Internet Control Message Protocol =

Internet protocol used for error messages in network operations

- Communication protocol
- A general header for ICMPv4
- Purpose: Auxiliary protocol for IPv4
- Developer: DARPA
- Introduction: 1981; 45 years ago
- OSI layer: Network layer
- IP number: 1
- RFC: 792

The Internet Control Message Protocol (ICMP) is a supporting protocol in the Internet protocol suite. It is used by network devices, including routers, to send error messages and operational information indicating success or failure when communicating with another IP address. For example, an error is indicated when a requested service is not available or that a host or router could not be reached. ICMP differs from transport protocols such as TCP and UDP in that it is not typically used to exchange data between systems, nor is it regularly employed by end-user network applications (with the exception of some diagnostic tools like ping and traceroute).

A separate Internet Control Message Protocol (called ICMPv6) is used with IPv6.

== Technical details ==
ICMP is part of the Internet protocol suite as defined in RFC 792. ICMP messages are typically used for diagnostic or control purposes or generated in response to errors in IP operations (as specified in RFC 1122). ICMP errors are directed to the source IP address of the originating packet.

For example, every device (such as an intermediate router) forwarding an IP datagram first decrements the time to live (TTL) field in the IP header by one. If the resulting TTL is 0, the packet is discarded and an ICMP time exceeded message is sent to the datagram's source address.

Many commonly used network utilities are based on ICMP messages. The traceroute command can be implemented by transmitting IP datagrams with specially set IP TTL header fields, and looking for ICMP time exceeded in transit and destination unreachable messages generated in response. The related ping utility is implemented using the ICMP echo request and echo reply messages.

ICMP uses the basic support of IP as if it were a higher-level protocol; however, ICMP is actually an integral part of IP. Although ICMP messages are contained within standard IP packets, they are usually processed as a special case, distinguished from normal IP processing. In many cases, it is necessary to inspect the contents of the ICMP message and deliver the appropriate error message to the application responsible for transmitting the IP packet that prompted the ICMP message to be sent.

ICMP is a network-layer protocol; this makes it a layer 3 protocol in the seven-layer OSI model. Based on the four-layer TCP/IP model, ICMP is an internet-layer protocol, which makes it a layer 2 protocol in the Internet Standard RFC 1122 TCP/IP four-layer model or a layer 3 protocol in the modern five-layer TCP/IP protocol definitions (by Kozierok, Comer, Tanenbaum, Forouzan, Kurose, Stallings).

There is no port number associated with an ICMP packet, as these numbers are associated with protocols in the transport layer above, such as TCP and UDP.

== Datagram structure ==
The ICMP packet is encapsulated in an IPv4 packet. The packet consists of header and data sections.

=== Header ===
The ICMP header starts after the IPv4 header and is identified by its protocol number, 1. All ICMP packets have an eight-byte header and a variable-sized data section. The first four bytes of the header have a fixed format, while the last four bytes depend on the type and code of the ICMP packet.

ICMP header format
Offset	Octet	0								1								2								3							
Octet	Bit	0	1	2	3	4	5	6	7	8	9	10	11	12	13	14	15	16	17	18	19	20	21	22	23	24	25	26	27	28	29	30	31
0	0	Type								Code								Checksum															
4	32	Rest of Header																															

Type: 8 bits
ICMP type, see § Control messages.
Code: 8 bits
ICMP subtype, see § Control messages.
Checksum: 16 bits
Internet checksum for error checking, calculated from the ICMP header and data with value 0 substituted for this field.
Rest of Header: 32 bits
Four-byte field, contents vary based on the ICMP type and code.

=== Data ===
ICMP error messages contain a data section that includes a copy of the entire IPv4 header, plus at least the first eight bytes of data from the IPv4 packet that caused the error message. The length of ICMP error messages should not exceed 576 bytes. This data is used by the host to match the message to the appropriate process. If a higher-level protocol uses port numbers, they are assumed to be in the first eight bytes of the original datagram's data.

The variable size of the ICMP packet data section has been exploited. In the "Ping of death", large or fragmented ICMP packets are used for denial-of-service attacks. ICMP data can also be used to create covert channels for communication. These channels are known as ICMP tunnels.

== Control messages ==
Control messages are identified by the value in the type field. The code field gives additional context information for the message. Some control messages have been deprecated since the protocol was first introduced.

Notable control messages
Type	Code	Status	Description
0 – Echo Reply	0		Echo reply (used to ping)
1 and 2		unassigned	Reserved
3 – Destination Unreachable	0		Destination network unreachable
3 – Destination Unreachable	1		Destination host unreachable
3 – Destination Unreachable	2		Destination protocol unreachable
3 – Destination Unreachable	3		Destination port unreachable
3 – Destination Unreachable	4		Fragmentation required, and DF flag set
3 – Destination Unreachable	5		Source route failed
3 – Destination Unreachable	6		Destination network unknown
3 – Destination Unreachable	7		Destination host unknown
3 – Destination Unreachable	8		Source host isolated
3 – Destination Unreachable	9		Network administratively prohibited
3 – Destination Unreachable	10		Host administratively prohibited
3 – Destination Unreachable	11		Network unreachable for ToS
3 – Destination Unreachable	12		Host unreachable for ToS
3 – Destination Unreachable	13		Communication administratively prohibited
3 – Destination Unreachable	14		Host Precedence Violation
3 – Destination Unreachable	15		Precedence cutoff in effect
4 – Source Quench	0	~~deprecated~~	Source quench (congestion control)
5 – Redirect Message	0		Redirect Datagram for the Network
5 – Redirect Message	1		Redirect Datagram for the Host
5 – Redirect Message	2		Redirect Datagram for the ToS & network
5 – Redirect Message	3		Redirect Datagram for the ToS & host
6		~~deprecated~~	Alternate Host Address
7		unassigned	Reserved
8 – Echo Request	0		Echo request (used to ping)
9 – Router Advertisement	0		Router Advertisement
10 – Router Solicitation	0		Router discovery/selection/solicitation
11 – Time Exceeded	0		Time to live (TTL) expired in transit
11 – Time Exceeded	1		Fragment reassembly time exceeded
12 – Parameter Problem: Bad IP header	0		Pointer indicates the error
12 – Parameter Problem: Bad IP header	1		Missing a required option
12 – Parameter Problem: Bad IP header	2		Bad length
13 – Timestamp	0		Timestamp
14 – Timestamp Reply	0		Timestamp reply
15 – Information Request	0	~~deprecated~~	Information Request
16 – Information Reply	0	~~deprecated~~	Information Reply
17 – Address Mask Request	0	~~deprecated~~	Address Mask Request
18 – Address Mask Reply	0	~~deprecated~~	Address Mask Reply
19		unassigned	Reserved for security
20 through 29		unassigned	Reserved for robustness experiment
30 – Traceroute	0	~~deprecated~~	Information Request
31		~~deprecated~~	Datagram Conversion Error
32		~~deprecated~~	Mobile Host Redirect
33		~~deprecated~~	Where-Are-You (originally meant for IPv6)
34		~~deprecated~~	Here-I-Am (originally meant for IPv6)
35		~~deprecated~~	Mobile Registration Request
36		~~deprecated~~	Mobile Registration Reply
37		~~deprecated~~	Domain Name Request
38		~~deprecated~~	Domain Name Reply
39		~~deprecated~~	SKIP Algorithm Discovery Protocol, Simple Key-Management for Internet Protocol
40			Photuris, Security failures
41		Experimental	ICMP for experimental mobility protocols such as Seamoby.
42 – Extended Echo Request	0		Request Extended Echo
43 – Extended Echo Reply	0		No Error
43 – Extended Echo Reply	1		Malformed Query
43 – Extended Echo Reply	2		No Such Interface
43 – Extended Echo Reply	3		No Such Table Entry
43 – Extended Echo Reply	4		Multiple Interfaces Satisfy Query
44 through 252		unassigned	Reserved
253		Experimental	RFC3692-style Experiment 1
254		Experimental	RFC3692-style Experiment 2
255		unassigned	Reserved

=== Source quench ===
Source Quench requests that the sender decrease the rate of messages sent to a router or host. This message may be generated if a router or host does not have sufficient buffer space to process the request, or may occur if the router or host buffer is approaching its limit.

Data is sent at a very high speed from a host or from several hosts at the same time to a particular router on a network. Although a router has buffering capabilities, the buffering is limited to within a specified range. The router cannot queue any more data than the capacity of the limited buffering space. Thus, if the queue gets filled up, incoming data is discarded until the queue is no longer full. But as no acknowledgement mechanism is present in the network layer, the client does not know whether the data has reached the destination successfully. Hence, some remedial measures should be taken by the network layer to avoid these kinds of situations. These measures are referred to as source quench.

In a source quench mechanism, the router sees that the incoming data rate is much faster than the outgoing data rate and sends an ICMP message to the clients, informing them that they should slow down their data transfer speeds or wait for a certain amount of time before attempting to send more data. When a client receives this message, it automatically slows down the outgoing data rate or waits for a sufficient amount of time, which enables the router to empty the queue. Thus, the source quench ICMP message acts as flow control in the network layer.

Since research suggested that "ICMP Source Quench [was] an ineffective (and unfair) antidote for congestion", routers' creation of source quench messages was deprecated in 1995 by RFC 1812. Furthermore, forwarding of and any kind of reaction to (flow control actions) source quench messages was deprecated from 2012 by RFC 6633.

Source quench message
00	01	02	03	04	05	06	07	08	09	10	11	12	13	14	15	16	17	18	19	20	21	22	23	24	25	26	27	28	29	30	31
Type = 4								Code = 0								Checksum															
unused
IP header and first 8 bytes of original datagram's data

Where:

- Type must be set to 4
- Code must be set to 0
- IP header and additional data is used by the sender to match the reply with the associated request

=== Redirect ===
An example of how an ICMPv4 redirect message works

Redirect requests that data packets be sent on an alternative route. ICMP Redirect is a mechanism for routers to convey routing information to hosts. The message informs a host to update its routing information (to send packets on an alternative route). If a host tries to send data through a router (R1) and R1 sends the data to another router (R2) and a direct path from the host to R2 is available (that is, the host and R2 are on the same subnetwork), then R1 will send a redirect message to inform the host that the best route for the destination is via R2. The host should then change its route information and send packets for that destination directly to R2. The router will still send the original datagram to the intended destination. However, if the datagram contains routing information, this message will not be sent even if a better route is available. RFC 1122 states that redirects should only be sent by gateways and should not be sent by Internet hosts.

Redirect message
00	01	02	03	04	05	06	07	08	09	10	11	12	13	14	15	16	17	18	19	20	21	22	23	24	25	26	27	28	29	30	31
Type = 5								Code								Checksum															
IP address
IP header and first 8 bytes of original datagram's data

Where:

- Type must be set to 5.
- Code specifies the reason for the redirection, and may be one of the following:
  Code	Description
  0	Redirect for Network
  1	Redirect for Host
  2	Redirect for Type of Service and Network
  3	Redirect for Type of Service and Host
- IP address is the 32-bit address of the gateway to which the redirection should be sent.
- IP header and additional data is included to allow the host to match the reply with the request that caused the redirection reply.

=== Time exceeded ===
Time Exceeded is generated by a gateway to inform the source of a discarded datagram due to the time to live field reaching zero. A time exceeded message may also be sent by a host if it fails to reassemble a fragmented datagram within its time limit.

Time exceeded messages are used by the traceroute utility to identify gateways on the path between two hosts.

Time exceeded message
00	01	02	03	04	05	06	07	08	09	10	11	12	13	14	15	16	17	18	19	20	21	22	23	24	25	26	27	28	29	30	31
Type = 11								Code								Checksum															
unused
IP header and first 8 bytes of original datagram's data

Where:

- Type must be set to 11
- Code specifies the reason for the time exceeded message, include the following:
  Code	Description
  0	Time-to-live exceeded in transit.
  1	Fragment reassembly time exceeded.
- IP header and first 64 bits of the original payload are used by the source host to match the time exceeded message to the discarded datagram. For higher-level protocols such as UDP and TCP the 64-bit payload will include the source and destination ports of the discarded packet.

=== Timestamp ===
Timestamp is used for time synchronization. The originating timestamp is set to the time (in milliseconds since midnight) the sender last touched the packet. The receive and transmit timestamps are not used.

Timestamp message
00	01	02	03	04	05	06	07	08	09	10	11	12	13	14	15	16	17	18	19	20	21	22	23	24	25	26	27	28	29	30	31
Type = 13								Code = 0								Checksum															
Identifier																Sequence number															
Originate timestamp
Receive timestamp
Transmit timestamp

Where:

- Type must be set to 13
- Code must be set to 0
- Identifier and Sequence Number can be used by the client to match the timestamp reply with the timestamp request.
- Originate timestamp is the number of milliseconds since midnight Universal Time (UT). If a UT reference is not available, the most-significant bit can be set to indicate a non-standard time value.

=== Timestamp reply ===
Timestamp Reply replies to a Timestamp message. It consists of the originating timestamp sent by the sender of the Timestamp as well as a receive timestamp indicating when the Timestamp was received and a transmit timestamp indicating when the Timestamp reply was sent.

Timestamp reply message
00	01	02	03	04	05	06	07	08	09	10	11	12	13	14	15	16	17	18	19	20	21	22	23	24	25	26	27	28	29	30	31
Type = 14								Code = 0								Checksum															
Identifier																Sequence number															
Originate timestamp
Receive timestamp
Transmit timestamp

Where:

- Type must be set to 14
- Code must be set to 0
- Identifier and Sequence number can be used by the client to match the reply with the request that caused the reply.
- Originate timestamp is the time the sender last touched the message before sending it.
- Receive timestamp is the time the echoer first touched it on receipt.
- Transmit timestamp is the time the echoer last touched the message on sending it.

All timestamps are in units of milliseconds since midnight UT. If the time is not available in milliseconds or cannot be provided with respect to midnight UT, then any time can be inserted in a timestamp, provided the high-order bit of the timestamp is also set to indicate this non-standard value.

The use of Timestamp and Timestamp Reply messages to synchronize the clocks of Internet nodes has largely been replaced by the UDP-based Network Time Protocol and the Precision Time Protocol.

=== Address mask request ===
Address mask request is normally sent by a host to a router in order to obtain an appropriate subnet mask.

Recipients should reply to this message with an Address mask reply message.

Address mask request
00	01	02	03	04	05	06	07	08	09	10	11	12	13	14	15	16	17	18	19	20	21	22	23	24	25	26	27	28	29	30	31
Type = 17								Code = 0								Checksum															
Identifier																Sequence number															
Address mask

Where:

- Type must be set to 17
- Code must be set to 0
- Address mask can be set to 0

ICMP Address Mask Request may be used as a part of reconnaissance attack to gather information on the target network, therefore ICMP Address Mask Reply is disabled by default on Cisco IOS.

=== Address mask reply ===
Address mask reply is used to reply to an address mask request message with an appropriate subnet mask.

Address mask reply
00	01	02	03	04	05	06	07	08	09	10	11	12	13	14	15	16	17	18	19	20	21	22	23	24	25	26	27	28	29	30	31
Type = 18								Code = 0								Checksum															
Identifier																Sequence number															
Address mask

Where:

- Type must be set to 18
- Code must be set to 0
- Address mask should be set to the subnet mask

=== Destination unreachable ===
Destination unreachable is generated by the host or its inbound gateway to inform the client that the destination is unreachable for some reason. Reasons for this message may include: the physical connection to the host does not exist (distance is infinite); the indicated protocol or port is not active; the data must be fragmented but the 'don't fragment' flag is on. Unreachable TCP ports notably respond with TCP RST rather than a destination unreachable type 3 as might be expected. Destination unreachable is never reported for IP multicast transmissions.

Destination unreachable message
Offset	Octet	0								1								2								3							
Octet	Bit	0	1	2	3	4	5	6	7	8	9	10	11	12	13	14	15	16	17	18	19	20	21	22	23	24	25	26	27	28	29	30	31
0	0	Type (3)								Code								Checksum															
4	32	Unused								(Length)								(Next-hop MTU)															
8	64	IP header and first bytes of original datagram's data																															
⋮	⋮	IP header and first bytes of original datagram's data																															
572	4576	IP header and first bytes of original datagram's data																															

With the following field contents:

Type: 8 bits; Type == 3
A value of 3 indicates 'Destination unreachable'.
Code: 8 bits
This specifies the type of error, and can be any of the following:

Code	Description
0	Network unreachable error.
1	Host unreachable error.
2	Protocol unreachable error (the designated transport protocol is not supported).
3	Port unreachable error (the designated protocol is unable to inform the host of the incoming message).
4	The datagram is too big. Packet fragmentation is required but the 'don't fragment' (DF) flag is on.
5	Source route failed error.
6	Destination network unknown error.
7	Destination host unknown error.
8	Source host isolated error.
9	The destination network is administratively prohibited.
10	The destination host is administratively prohibited.
11	The network is unreachable for Type Of Service.
12	The host is unreachable for Type Of Service.
13	Communication administratively prohibited (administrative filtering prevents packet from being forwarded).
14	Host precedence violation (indicates the requested precedence is not permitted for the combination of host or network and port).
15	Precedence cutoff in effect (precedence of datagram is below the level set by the network administrators).

Unused: 8 - 32 bits; Unused == 0
Unused, must be set to zero. If Length or Next-hop MTU are not used, they are considered part of this field.
Length: 8 bits
Optional. The Length field indicates the length of the original datagram data, in 32-bit words. This allows this ICMP message to be extended with extra information. If used, the original datagram data must be padded with zeroes to the nearest 32-bit boundary.
Next-hop MTU: 16 bits
Optional. Contains the MTU of the next-hop network if a code 4 error occurs.
IP header and data: 20 - 568 bytes
The IP header (20 bytes) and at most 548 bytes of the start of the original datagram (as not to exceed the minimum IPv4 reassembly buffer size). If this message is extended, then this field must contain at least 128 bytes of original datagram data (padded with zeroes if necessary).
These data are included to allow the client to match the reply with the request that caused the Destination unreachable reply.

== Extensions ==
ICMP messages can be extended with extra information. This information is carried in one or more Extension Objects, which are preceded by an ICMP Extension Header.

ICMP Extension Header
Offset	Octet	0								1								2								3							
Octet	Bit	0	1	2	3	4	5	6	7	8	9	10	11	12	13	14	15	16	17	18	19	20	21	22	23	24	25	26	27	28	29	30	31
0	0	Version				Reserved												Checksum															
4	32	Extension Objects																															
8	64	Extension Objects																															
⋮	⋮	Extension Objects																															

Version: 4 bits; Version == 2
Extension header version.
Reserved: 12 bits; Reserved == 0
Reserved.
Checksum: 16 bits
Checksum over this header and all extension objects. This field itself is included, so it is set to zero while performing the calculation.

Extension objects have the following general structure:

Extension object header
Offset	Octet	0								1								2								3							
Octet	Bit	0	1	2	3	4	5	6	7	8	9	10	11	12	13	14	15	16	17	18	19	20	21	22	23	24	25	26	27	28	29	30	31
0	0	Length																Class-Num								C-Type							
4	32	(Object payload)																															
8	64	(Object payload)																															
⋮	⋮	(Object payload)																															

Length: 16 bits
The length of the object in octets, including the header.
Class-Num: 8 bits
Identifies the object's class.
C-Type: 8 bits
Identifies the object's subtype.
Object payload: Variable
Optional payload. If nonempty, it contains a data structure, whose size is a multiple of 32 bits.

== See also ==
- ICMP hole punching
- PathPing
- Path MTU Discovery
- Smurf attack
