= San Filippo =

San Filippo may refer to:

- San Filippo syndrome, rare autosomal recessive lysosomal storage disease
- San Filippo del Mela, comune in the Metropolitan City of Messina in the Italian region Sicily
- San Filippo, Matelica, a Baroque-style, Roman Catholic church and monastery in the city of Matelica, province of Macerata, region of Marche, Italy

== See also ==
- Sanfilippo
- San Filippo Neri (disambiguation)
