= Prefix WhoIs =

Framework for Internet routing information

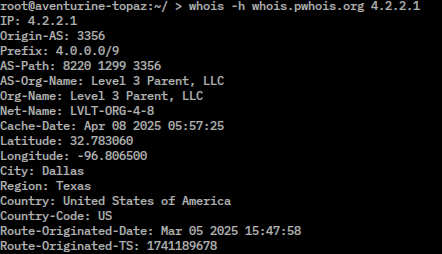
This example Prefix WhoIs query shows various information about an IP address including its network origin and registrar details

Prefix WhoIs is an open source project that develops and operates a free whois-compatible framework for stockpiling and querying various routing and registry information. Prefix WhoIs uses global BGP routing data learned from many ISP backbone routers. Other information sources are also supported, such as imported data from every regional Internet registry (AFRINIC, APNIC, ARIN, LACNIC, and RIPE) and geocoding information.

The project has been mentioned in a number of popular network security and network engineering books and articles.

== Public Prefix WhoIs Service ==
Many public servers around the world operate mirrors of Prefix WhoIs, making the information generally available worldwide. The service may be used with any client using the standard whois protocol. The DNS address whois.pwhois.org resolves to the Prefix WhoIs server nearest to the client based on anycast DNS.

== Client Software ==
Several client software packages are available from both Prefix WhoIs itself and from commercial vendors. These include free, open source utilities such as WhoB and Layer Four Traceroute.

== Server Software ==
- The pWhoIsd server software responds to standard whois queries and supports a variety of output formats (including Prefix WhoIs native, Cymru, and RPSL).
- The pWhoIs-updatedb agent parses routing information bases (RIBs) from Internet routers or digests from route-views servers in text or MRT format and populates a relational database

== Software Development Libraries ==
The Prefix WhoIs project distributes C and PHP libraries for direct access to Prefix WhoIs servers. A HTTP simpleQuery interface is also available.

== Software licensing ==
The software is made available under a custom license.
