= Salvatore Sanfilippo =

Italian programmer and creator of Redis

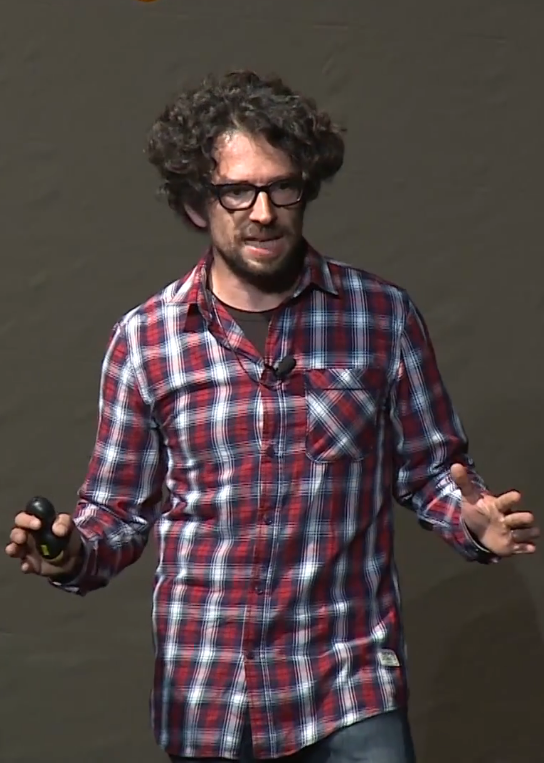
- Sanfilippo at dotScale 2015
- Born: Salvatore Sanfilippo; March 7, 1977 (age 49); Campobello di Licata, Sicily, Italy
- Other name: antirez
- Occupations: Computer programmer, author
- Known for: Creator of Redis, hping, Idle scan
- Website: invece.org

Salvatore Sanfilippo (born 7 March 1977 in Sicily, Italy), known online as "antirez", is an Italian computer programmer, hacker and author. He is best known as the creator of the Redis in-memory database, which he developed and led for over a decade.

Sanfilippo is also the author of several other open-source projects, including the network security tools hping and the Idle scan discovery method. In addition to his work in software, he has also published a science fiction novel. He has an active YouTube channel in English and Italian.

== Early life ==
Sanfilippo was born in Campobello di Licata, Sicily, on March 7, 1977. He grew up in a marginalized area of southern Sicily, near Gela, and moved to Palermo at the age of 17 to study architecture, though he did not complete his university studies, later shifting his focus to computer science.

== Career ==
=== Computer Security ===
While working in computer security, Sanfilippo developed and released several influential tools under the alias "antirez".

- hping: An open-source packet generator and analyzer for the TCP/IP protocol. It is used for security auditing and testing of firewalls and networks.
- Idle scan: A TCP port scan method that allows for "blind" port scanning, where the attacker's true IP address is not revealed to the target. Sanfilippo first published the technique in 1998, and it was later implemented in security scanners like Nmap.

=== Redis ===
Sanfilippo began development on Redis in 2009. The project's creation was motivated by his attempt to improve the scalability of his Italian startup, LLOOGG, a real-time web log analyzer. After encountering issues with traditional database systems, he began prototyping an in-memory database that would become Redis.

He open-sourced the project and served as its primary developer and Benevolent Dictator for Life (BDFL) for 11 years. During this time, the project's development was sponsored by VMware (2010–2013), Pivotal Software (2013–2015), and later Redis (formerly Redis Labs) (2015–2020). Redis grew to become adopted worldwide, widely used for caching, message brokering, and as a primary database.

On June 30, 2020, Sanfilippo announced he was stepping down as the maintainer of the Redis project, citing a desire to pursue other projects and a dislike for the maintenance-focused phase of the project's life. He passed leadership to Yossi Gottlieb and Oran Agra.

In December 2024, Sanfilippo announced he was returning to Redis (the company) in the role of a "Redis evangelist". Following his return, he developed and implemented a new data structure for the database, the Vector Set, designed for vector similarity search.

=== Other Notable Projects ===
Sanfilippo is a prolific open-source developer. Some of his other well-known projects include:

- Kilo: A small text editor written in less than 1000 lines of ANSI C code, which serves as a popular educational resource for learning C.
- Dump1090: A popular command-line ADS-B Mode S decoder for RTL-SDR software-defined radio devices.
- Linenoise: A minimal, self-contained alternative to the GNU Readline library.
- Disque: A distributed, in-memory message broker.
- Jim Tcl: An open-source small-footprint implementation of the Tcl programming language, used in many embedded environments.
- DwarfStar 4 is a local AI engine developed for DeepSeek V4 Flash, but it is not limited to that model.

=== Writing and Media ===
Sanfilippo is also a fiction author. His first science fiction novel, Wohpe, was published in Italy in 2022. An official English translation exists.

Since 2024, he has maintained an active YouTube channel, where he publishes videos in Italian and English about programming, technology, retrocomputing, finance, and his projects. This includes a complete course on programming in the C language.

== See also ==
- Redis
- hping
- Idle scan
- Nmap
