= PathPing =

Windows command-line network utility

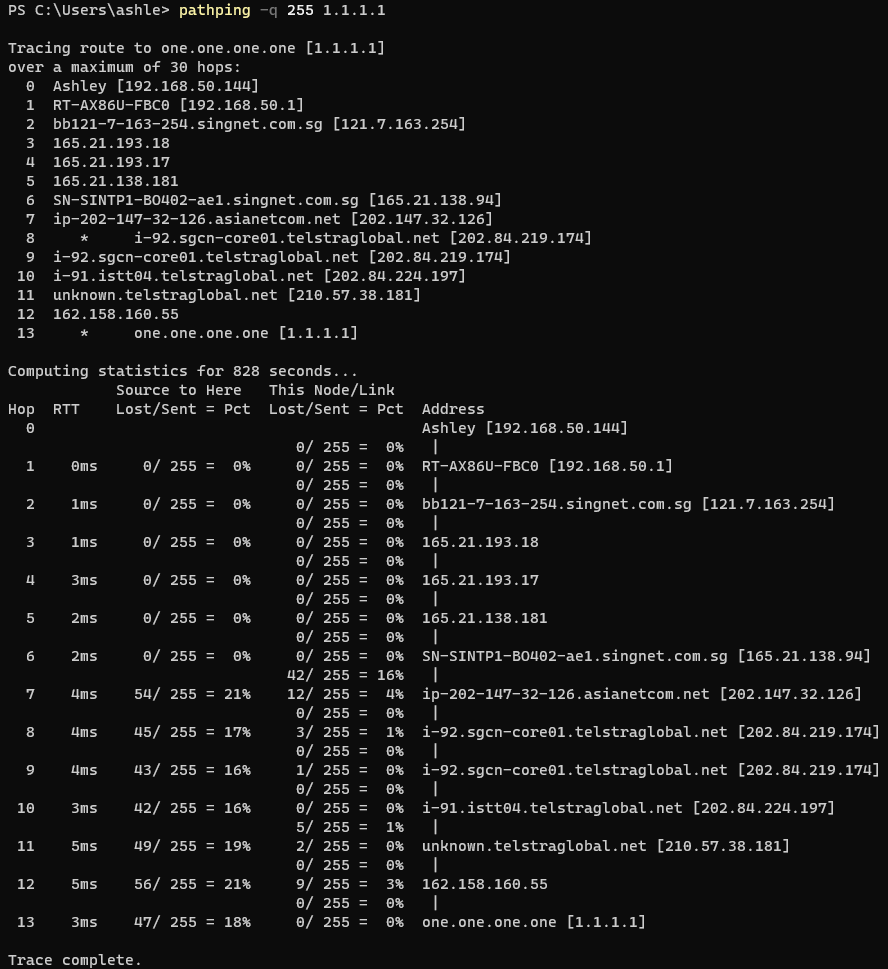
- The PathPing command
- Developer(s): Microsoft
- Initial release: February 17, 2000; 25 years ago
- Operating system: Microsoft Windows
- Type: Command
- License: Proprietary commercial software
- Website: docs.microsoft.com/en-us/windows-server/administration/windows-commands/pathping

The PathPing command is a command-line network utility included in Windows NT operating systems since Windows 2000 that combines the functionality of ping with that of tracert. It is used to locate spots that have network latency and network loss.

== Overview ==
The command provides details of the path between two hosts and ping-like statistics for each node in the path based on samples taken over a time period, depending on how many nodes are between the start and end host.

The advantages of PathPing over ping and traceroute are that each node is pinged as the result of a single command, and that the behavior of nodes is studied over an extended time period, rather than the default ping sample of four messages or default traceroute single route trace. The disadvantage is that it takes a total of 25 seconds per hop to show the ping statistics.

== Syntax ==
The command-syntax is:

 pathping [-g host-list] [-h maximum_hops] [-i address] [-n]
          [-p period] [-q num_queries] [-w timeout] [-P] [-R] [-T]
          [-4] [-6] target_name

Options:

- -g host-list Loose source route along host-list.
- -h maximum_hops Maximum number of hops to search for target.
- -i address Use the specified source address.
- -n Do not resolve addresses to hostnames.
- -p period Wait period milliseconds between pings.
- -q num_queries Number of queries per hop.
- -w timeout Wait timeout milliseconds for each reply.
- -P Test for RSVP PATH connectivity.
- -R Test if each hop is RSVP aware.
- -T Test connectivity to each hop with Layer-2 priority tags.
- -4 Force using IPv4.
- -6 Force using IPv6.

== Samples ==
Default behavior:

>pathping wikipedia.org

Tracing route to wikipedia.com [207.142.131.235]
over a maximum of 30 hops:
  0  simonslaptop [192.168.0.11] 
  1  192.168.0.1 
  2  thus1-hg2.ilford.broadband.bt.net [217.32.64.73] 
  3  217.32.64.34 
  4  217.32.64.110 
  5  anchor-border-1-4-0-2-191.router.demon.net [212.240.162.126] 
  6  anchor-core-2-g0-0-1.router.demon.net [194.70.98.29] 
  7  ny1-border-1-a1-0-s2.router.demon.net [194.70.97.66] 
  8  ge-8-0-153.ipcolo1.NewYork1.Level3.net [209.246.123.177] 
  9  ae-0-51.bbr1.NewYork1.Level3.net [64.159.17.1] 
 10  so-2-0-0.mp1.Tampa1.Level3.net [209.247.11.201] 
 11  ge-6-0.hsa2.Tampa1.Level3.net [64.159.1.10] 
 12  unknown.Level3.net [63.208.24.2] 
 13

Computing statistics for 325 seconds...
            Source to Here   This Node/Link
Hop  RTT    Lost/Sent = Pct  Lost/Sent = Pct  Address
  0                                           simonslaptop [192.168.0.11] 
                                0/ 100 =  0%   |
  1    0ms     0/ 100 =  0%     0/ 100 =  0%  192.168.0.1 
                                0/ 100 =  0%   |
  2   18ms     1/ 100 =  1%     1/ 100 =  1%  thus1-hg2.ilford.broadband.bt.net  [217.32.64.73]  
                                0/ 100 =  0%   |
  3   18ms     0/ 100 =  0%     0/ 100 =  0%  217.32.64.34 
                                0/ 100 =  0%   |
  4   21ms     0/ 100 =  0%     0/ 100 =  0%  217.32.64.110 
                                0/ 100 =  0%   |
  5   21ms     1/ 100 =  1%     1/ 100 =  1%  anchor-border-1-4-0-2-191.router.demon.net [212.240.162.126] 
                                0/ 100 =  0%   |
  6  ---     100/ 100 =100%   100/ 100 =100%  anchor-core-2-g0-0-1.router.demon.net [194.70.98.29] 
                                0/ 100 =  0%   |
  7  ---     100/ 100 =100%   100/ 100 =100%  ny1-border-1-a1-0-s2.router.demon.net [194.70.97.66] 
                                0/ 100 =  0%   |
  8  100ms     0/ 100 =  0%     0/ 100 =  0%  ge-8-0-153.ipcolo1.NewYork1.Level3.net [209.246.123.177] 
                                5/ 100 =  5%   |
  9   94ms     5/ 100 =  5%     0/ 100 =  0%  ae-0-51.bbr1.NewYork1.Level3.net [64.159.17.1] 
                                0/ 100 =  0%   |
 10  134ms     7/ 100 =  7%     2/ 100 =  2%  so-2-0-0.mp1.Tampa1.Level3.net [209.247.11.201] 
                                0/ 100 =  0%   |
 11  137ms     6/ 100 =  6%     1/ 100 =  1%  ge-6-0.hsa2.Tampa1.Level3.net [64.159.1.10] 
                               30/ 100 = 30%   |
 12  131ms    41/ 100 = 41%     6/ 100 =  6%  unknown.Level3.net [63.208.24.2] 
                               59/ 100 = 59%   |
 13  ---     100/ 100 =100%     0/ 100 =  0%  win2000 [0.0.0.0]

Trace complete.

Setting the number of queries per hop, in this case reducing it from 100 to 10 for faster completion:

>pathping -q 10 wikipedia.org
 
 Tracing route to wikipedia.org [66.230.200.100]
 over a maximum of 30 hops:
   0  Aaron.hsd1.mn.comcast.net. [192.168.11.3]
   1  air.setup [192.168.11.1]
   2  73.127.68.1
   3  ge-1-38-ur01.minnetonka.mn.minn.comcast.net [68.86.234.41]
   4  68.86.232.37
   5  68.86.232.33
   6  68.86.232.5
   7  68.86.232.1
   8     *     12.116.99.41
   9  tbr2.cgcil.ip.att.net [12.122.99.70]
  10     *     ggr2.cgcil.ip.att.net [12.123.6.69]
  11  ar1-a3120s2.wswdc.ip.att.net [192.205.34.6]
  12  66.192.247.163
  13  ge8-13.csw5-pmtpa.wikimedia.org [66.193.50.242]
  14     *     rr.pmtpa.wikimedia.org [66.230.200.100]
 
 Computing statistics for 35 seconds...
             Source to Here   This Node/Link
 Hop  RTT    Lost/Sent = Pct  Lost/Sent = Pct  Address
   0                                           Aaron.hsd1.mn.comcast.net. [192.168.11.3]
                                 0/  10 =  0%   |
   1    0ms     0/  10 =  0%     0/  10 =  0%  air.setup [192.168.11.1]
                                 0/  10 =  0%   |
   2    8ms     0/  10 =  0%     0/  10 =  0%  73.127.68.1
                                 0/  10 =  0%   |
   3    8ms     0/  10 =  0%     0/  10 =  0%  ge-1-38-ur01.minnetonka.mn.minn.comcast.net [68.86.234.41]
                                 0/  10 =  0%   |
   4    9ms     0/  10 =  0%     0/  10 =  0%  68.86.232.37
                                 0/  10 =  0%   |
   5    8ms     0/  10 =  0%     0/  10 =  0%  68.86.232.33
                                 0/  10 =  0%   |
   6   12ms     0/  10 =  0%     0/  10 =  0%  68.86.232.5
                                 0/  10 =  0%   |
   7    8ms     0/  10 =  0%     0/  10 =  0%  68.86.232.1
                                 0/  10 =  0%   |
   8  ---      10/  10 =100%    10/  10 =100%  12.116.99.41
                                 0/  10 =  0%   |
   9   20ms     0/  10 =  0%     0/  10 =  0%  tbr2.cgcil.ip.att.net [12.122.99.70]
                                 0/  10 =  0%   |
  10   18ms     2/  10 = 20%     2/  10 = 20%  ggr2.cgcil.ip.att.net [12.123.6.69]
                                 1/  10 = 10%   |
  11  ---      10/  10 =100%     9/  10 = 90%  ar1-a3120s2.wswdc.ip.att.net [192.205.34.6]
                                 0/  10 =  0%   |
  12   44ms     2/  10 = 20%     1/  10 = 10%  66.192.247.163
                                 0/  10 =  0%   |
  13   63ms     1/  10 = 10%     0/  10 =  0%  ge8-13.csw5-pmtpa.wikimedia.org [66.193.50.242]
                                 0/  10 =  0%   |
  14   63ms     6/  10 = 60%     5/  10 = 50%  rr.pmtpa.wikimedia.org [66.230.200.100]
 
 Trace complete.

Do not resolve hostnames (only IP addresses are given for the nodes):

>pathping -n wikipedia.org

Tracing route to wikipedia-lb.eqiad.wikimedia.org [208.80.154.225]over a maximum of 30 hops:
 0  192.168.1.102
 1  192.168.1.1
 2  10.202.181.110
 3  10.202.182.109
 4  10.202.181.153
 5  10.202.181.49
 6  212.72.4.97
 7  82.178.32.102
 8  63.218.109.117
 9  63.218.44.38
10  206.111.0.249
11  216.156.8.189
12     *        *        *
Computing statistics for 275 seconds...

== See also ==
- ping (networking utility)
- traceroute
- MTR – software which combines the functionality of traceroute and ping
- Layer four traceroute – a more modern traceroute (IP network tracing) implementation that supports a multitude of layer-4 protocols
