= Rowan Trollope =

Canadian businessman

Rowan Trollope (born August 16, 1972) is an American business executive and technology entrepreneur. He is the CEO of Redis, an American database software company. He was previously the CEO of Five9. He resides near Lake Tahoe, in Truckee, California.

== Career ==
Rowan Trollope worked for Symantec, holding various engineering and executive roles from 1991 until November, 2012. While at Symantec, he worked his way up to the position of Group President of Sales and Marketing, responsible for the small and midsized business (SMB) segment and Symantec.cloud, Symantec's software-as-a-service (SaaS) division.

In 2012, Rowan Trollope departed Symantec to take a position at Cisco; there, he became Senior Vice President and General Manager of Cisco’s Collaboration Technology Group.

Trollope joined Five9, a maker of intelligent cloud software for contact centers, as their CEO in May 2018.

While at Five9, Rowan Trollope joined Neat.no in 2019, as an advisor and early investor alongside Eric Yuan, founder and CEO of Zoom and OJ Winge.

Rowan Trollope announced his resignation from Five9 on October 10, 2022, effective November 28, 2022.

In December, 2022, Redis, Ltd. announced Trollope would be replacing their CEO. Trollope took over the role as CEO of Redis, Ltd. in February, 2023.

Rowan Trollope joined the Board of Directors of Smartsheet, Inc. in 2020. He also became a member of the Docusign Board of Directors in May, 2026.

He holds multiple patents.
