= Simple Key-Management for Internet Protocol =

Simple Key-Management for Internet Protocol or SKIP was a protocol developed circa 1995 by the IETF Security Working Group for the sharing of encryption keys. SKIP and Photuris were evaluated as key exchange mechanisms for IPsec before the adoption of IKE in 1998.

Simple Key Management for Internet Protocols (SKIP) is similar to SSL, except that it establishes a long-term key once, and then requires no prior communication in order to establish or exchange keys on a session-by-session basis. Therefore, no connection setup overhead exists and new keys values are not continually generated.
