= Sam Spade (software) =

Discontinued Windows anti-spam investigation software

Sam Spade is a discontinued Windows network investigation tool used to help trace sources of email spam. The same name was also used for a related free web service that provided access to similar lookup tools. The utility was written by Steve Atkins in 1997 and was named after the fictional detective Sam Spade.

The SamSpade.org website was still available in early 2004, but later reported outage problems caused by "blackholing of SamSpade.org by several RIRs and general heavy usage."

== Query tools ==
Sam Spade combined several network lookup and message-analysis functions in a graphical interface. Its documented tools included DNS lookup functions, whois, traceroute, web browsing in raw HTTP form, URL decoding, email header parsing, SMTP relay checking, port scanning, and website crawling.

According to the archived feature documentation, specific functions included:

- Zone transfer, which queried a DNS server for records associated with a domain;
- SMTP relay checking, which tested whether a mail server permitted third-party relaying;
- Address scanning for open ports;
- Website crawling for email addresses and offsite links;
- Raw HTTP web browsing;
- Searching a news server for cancel messages;
- Fast and slow traceroute functions;
- S-Lang scripting commands;
- URL decoding;
- Email header parsing.
