= Ping (networking utility) =

Network utility used to test the reachability of a host

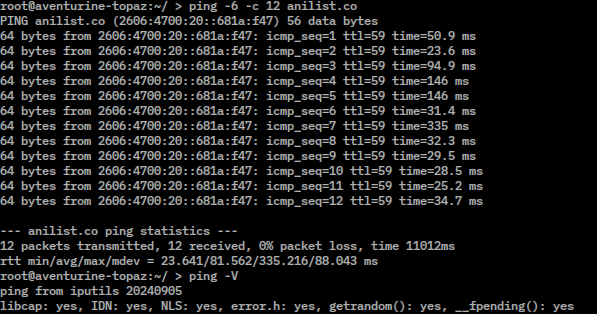
- Linux version of ping (iputils)
- Original author: Mike Muuss
- Developers: Various open-source and commercial developers
- Release: 1983; 43 years ago
- Platform: Cross-platform
- Type: Command
- License: Public-domain, BSD, GPL, MIT

Ping is a network management software utility used to test the reachability of a host on an Internet Protocol (IP) network. It is available in a wide range of operating systems.

Ping measures the round-trip time for messages sent from the originating host to a destination computer that are echoed back to the source. The name comes from active sonar terminology that sends a pulse of sound and listens for the echo to detect objects under water.

Ping operates by means of Internet Control Message Protocol (ICMP) packets. Pinging involves sending an ICMP echo request to the target host and waiting for an ICMP echo reply. The program reports errors, packet loss, and a statistical summary of the results, typically including the minimum, maximum, the mean round-trip times, and standard deviation of the mean.

Command-line options and terminal output vary by implementation. Options may include the size of the payload, count of tests, limits for the number of network hops (TTL) that probes traverse, interval between the requests and time to wait for a response. Many systems provide a companion utility ping6, for testing on Internet Protocol version 6 (IPv6) networks, which uses ICMPv6.

== History ==
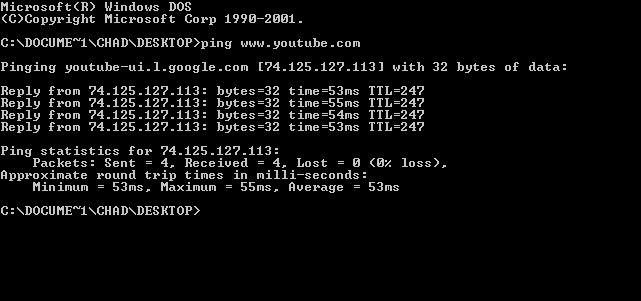
DOS version of ping

The ping utility was written by Mike Muuss in December 1983 during his employment at the Ballistic Research Laboratory, now the US Army Research Laboratory. A remark by David Mills on using ICMP echo packets for IP network diagnosis and measurements prompted Muuss to create the utility to troubleshoot network problems. The author named it after the sound that sonar makes since its methodology is analogous to sonar's echolocation. The backronym Packet Internet Groper for ping has been used for over 30 years. Muuss says that, from his point of view, ping was not intended as an acronym but he has acknowledged Mills's expansion of the name. The first released version was public domain software; all subsequent versions have been licensed under the BSD license. Ping was first included in 4.3BSD. The FreeDOS version was developed by Erick Engelke and is licensed under the GPL. Tim Crawford developed the ReactOS version. It is licensed under the MIT License.

Any host must process ICMP echo requests and issue echo replies in return.

== Invocation example ==
The following is the output of running ping on Linux for sending five probes (1-second interval by default, configurable via -i option) to the target host www.example.com:

$ ping -c 5 www.example.com

PING www.example.com (93.184.216.34): 56 data bytes
64 bytes from 93.184.216.34: icmp_seq=0 ttl=56 time=11.632 ms
64 bytes from 93.184.216.34: icmp_seq=1 ttl=56 time=11.726 ms
64 bytes from 93.184.216.34: icmp_seq=2 ttl=56 time=10.683 ms
64 bytes from 93.184.216.34: icmp_seq=3 ttl=56 time=9.674 ms
64 bytes from 93.184.216.34: icmp_seq=4 ttl=56 time=11.127 ms

--- www.example.com ping statistics ---
5 packets transmitted, 5 packets received, 0.0% packet loss
round-trip min/avg/max/stddev = 9.674/10.968/11.726/0.748 ms

The output lists each probe message and the results obtained. Finally, it lists the statistics of the entire test. In this example, the shortest round-trip time was 9.674 ms, the average was 10.968 ms, and the maximum value was 11.726 ms. The measurement had a standard deviation of 0.748 ms.

== Error indications ==
In cases of no response from the target host, most implementations display either nothing or periodically print notifications about timing out. Possible ping results indicating a problem include the following:

- H, !N or !P – host, network or protocol unreachable
- S – source route failed
- F – fragmentation needed
- U or !W – destination network/host unknown
- I – source host is isolated
- A – communication with destination network administratively prohibited
- Z – communication with destination host administratively prohibited
- Q – for this ToS the destination network is unreachable
- T – for this ToS the destination host is unreachable
- X – communication administratively prohibited
- V – host precedence violation
- C – precedence cutoff in effect

In case of error, the target host or an intermediate router sends back an ICMP error message, for example host unreachable or TTL exceeded in transit. In addition, these messages include the first eight bytes of the original message (in this case, the header of the ICMP echo request, including the quench value), so the ping utility can match responses to originating queries.

== Message format ==
=== ICMP packet transported with IPv4 ===
An ICMP packet transported with IPv4 looks like this.

IPv4 datagram
Offset	Octet	0								1								2								3							
Octet	Bit	0	1	2	3	4	5	6	7	8	9	10	11	12	13	14	15	16	17	18	19	20	21	22	23	24	25	26	27	28	29	30	31
0	0	Version (4)				IHL (5)				DSCP (0)						ECN (0)		Total length															
4	32	Identification																Flags			Fragment offset												
8	64	Time to live								Protocol (1)								Header checksum															
12	96	Source address																															
16	128	Destination address																															

ICMP Echo Request packet
Offset	Octet	0								1								2								3							
Octet	Bit	0	1	2	3	4	5	6	7	8	9	10	11	12	13	14	15	16	17	18	19	20	21	22	23	24	25	26	27	28	29	30	31
20	160	Type (8)								Code (0)								Checksum															
24	192	Identifier																Sequence number															
28	224	(Payload)																															
32	256	(Payload)																															
⋮	⋮	(Payload)																															

Type: 8 bits
Set to 8 to indicate 'Echo Request'.
Checksum: 16 bits
Checksum is the 16-bit ones' complement of the ones' complement sum of the ICMP packet, starting with the Type field, including the Payload. The IP header is not included.
Identifier: 16 bits
Can be used by the client to match the reply with the request that caused the reply.
Sequence number: 16 bits
Can be used by the client to match the reply with the request that caused the reply.
Payload: variable length
Optional. Payload for the different kind of answers; can be an arbitrary length, left to implementation detail.

Most Linux systems use a unique Identifier for every ping process, and Sequence number is an increasing number within that process. Windows uses a fixed Identifier, which varies between Windows versions, and a Sequence number that is only reset at boot time.

The Echo Reply is returned as:

ICMP Echo Reply packet
Offset	Octet	0								1								2								3							
Octet	Bit	0	1	2	3	4	5	6	7	8	9	10	11	12	13	14	15	16	17	18	19	20	21	22	23	24	25	26	27	28	29	30	31
20	160	Type (0)								Code (0)								Checksum															
24	192	Identifier																Sequence number															
28	224	(Payload)																															
32	256	(Payload)																															
⋮	⋮	(Payload)																															

Type: 8 bits
Set to 0 to indicate 'Echo Reply'.
Identifier: 16 bits
Copied from the Echo Request and returned.
Sequence number: 16 bits
Copied from the Echo Request and returned.
Payload: variable length
Optional. Payload is copied from the Echo Request and returned.

=== ICMPv6 packet transported with IPv6 ===
An ICMP packet transported with IPv6 looks like this.

IPv6 datagram
Offset	Octet	0								1								2								3							
Octet	Bit	0	1	2	3	4	5	6	7	8	9	10	11	12	13	14	15	16	17	18	19	20	21	22	23	24	25	26	27	28	29	30	31
0	0	Version (6)				Traffic class								Flow label																			
4	32	Payload length																Next header (58)								Hop limit							
8	64	Source address																															
12	96	Source address																															
16	128	Source address																															
20	160	Source address																															
24	192	Destination address																															
28	224	Destination address																															
32	256	Destination address																															
36	288	Destination address																															

ICMPv6 Echo Request packet
Offset	Octet	0								1								2								3							
Octet	Bit	0	1	2	3	4	5	6	7	8	9	10	11	12	13	14	15	16	17	18	19	20	21	22	23	24	25	26	27	28	29	30	31
40	320	Type (128)								Code (0)								Checksum															
44	352	Identifier																Sequence number															
48	384	(Payload)																															
52	416	(Payload)																															
⋮	⋮	(Payload)																															

Type: 8 bits
Set to 128 to indicate 'Echo Request'.
Identifier: 16 bits
Can be used by the client to match the reply with the request that caused the reply.
Sequence number: 16 bits
Can be used by the client to match the reply with the request that caused the reply.
Checksum: 16 bits
The checksum is calculated from the ICMP message (starting with the Type field), prepended with an IPv6 pseudo-header.
Payload: variable length
Optional. Payload for the different kind of answers; can be an arbitrary length, left to implementation detail.

Most Linux systems use a unique Identifier for every ping process, and Sequence number is an increasing number within that process. Windows uses a fixed Identifier, which varies between Windows versions, and a Sequence number that is only reset at boot time.

The Echo Reply is returned as:

ICMPv6 Echo Reply packet
Offset	Octet	0								1								2								3							
Octet	Bit	0	1	2	3	4	5	6	7	8	9	10	11	12	13	14	15	16	17	18	19	20	21	22	23	24	25	26	27	28	29	30	31
40	320	Type (129)								Code (0)								Checksum															
44	352	Identifier																Sequence number															
48	384	(Payload)																															
52	416	(Payload)																															
⋮	⋮	(Payload)																															

Type: 8 bits
Set to 129 to indicate 'Echo Reply'.
Identifier: 16 bits
Copied from the Echo Request and returned.
Sequence number: 16 bits
Copied from the Echo Request and returned.
Payload: variable length
Optional. Payload is copied from the Echo Request and returned.

=== Payload ===
The payload of the packet is generally filled with ASCII characters, as the output of the tcpdump utility shows in the last 32 bytes of the following example (after the eight-byte ICMP header starting with 0x0800):

16:24:47.966461 IP (tos 0x0, ttl 128, id 15103, offset 0, flags [none],
proto: ICMP (1), length: 60) 192.168.146.22 > 192.168.144.5: ICMP echo request,
id 1, seq 38, length 40
       0x0000:  4500 003c 3aff 0000 8001 5c55 c0a8 9216  E..<:.....\U....
       0x0010:  c0a8 9005 0800 4d35 0001 0026 6162 6364  ......M5...&abcd
       0x0020:  6566 6768 696a 6b6c 6d6e 6f70 7172 7374  efghijklmnopqrst
       0x0030:  7576 7761 6263 6465 6667 6869            uvwabcdefghi

The payload may include a timestamp indicating the time of transmission and a sequence number, which are not found in this example. This allows ping to compute the round-trip time in a stateless manner without needing to record the time of transmission of each packet.

The payload may also include a magic packet for the Wake-on-LAN protocol, but the minimum payload, in that case, is longer than shown. The Echo Request typically does not receive any reply if the host was sleeping in hibernation state, but the host still wakes up from sleep state if its interface is configured to accept wakeup requests. If the host is already active and configured to allow replies to incoming ICMP Echo Request packets, the returned reply should include the same payload. This may be used to detect that the remote host was effectively woken up by repeating a new request after some delay to allow the host to resume its network services. If the host was just sleeping in a low-power active state, a single request wakes up that host just enough to allow its Echo Reply service to reply instantly if that service was enabled. The host does not need to wake up all devices completely and may return to low-power mode after a short delay. Such a configuration may be used to avoid a host entering hibernation state, with much longer wake-up delay, after some time passed in low power active mode.

A packet including IP and ICMP headers must not be greater than the maximum transmission unit of the network, or risk being fragmented.

== Security loopholes ==
To conduct a denial-of-service attack, an attacker may send ping requests as fast as possible, possibly overwhelming the victim with ICMP echo requests. This technique is called a ping flood.

Ping requests to multiple addresses, ping sweeps, may be used to obtain a list of all hosts on a network.

== See also ==
- fping
- hping
- Keepalive
- nping
- PathPing
- Ping of death
- Ping-pong scheme
- Smurf attack
- Traceroute
