= Redis (company) =

American private computer software company

Redis, Inc. Redis, Ltd.
- Formerly: Redis Labs, Garantia Data
- Type: Private
- Industry: NoSQL
- Founded: 2011; 15 years ago
- Headquarters: San Francisco, California, USA
- Key people: Ofer Bengal; Yiftach Shoolman; Rowan Trollope (CEO since November 28, 2022)
- Products: Redis Enterprise Software; Redis Enterprise Cloud; Enterprise tiers, Azure Cache for Redis
- Website: redis.io

Redis Ltd. (originally Redis Labs, Garantia Data) is an American private computer software company headquartered in San Francisco, California. Redis is the sponsor of the source-available in-memory NoSQL database Redis, and the provider of Redis Enterprise software, cloud services, and tools for global companies. The company’s research and development center is based in Tel Aviv, Israel. It has additional offices in London, Austin, Bengaluru, and Sofia.

== History ==
Redis Ltd was founded under the name Garantia Data in 2011 by Ofer Bengal, previously the founder and CEO of RiT Technologies, and Yiftach Shoolman, previously the founder and president of Crescendo Networks.

In June 2012, the company announced a beta version of its cloud services at GigaOm's Structure LaunchPad. Redis Enterprise Cloud became generally available in February 2013.

In October 2013, Garantia Data acquired MyRedis, a competing hosted provider of Redis software.

On January 29, 2014, the company changed its name from Garantia Data to Redis Labs.

In early 2015, Redis Labs made available the Redis Enterprise Pack. On July 15, 2015, the creator of Redis and its lead developer, Salvatore Sanfilippo, joined Redis Labs. Redis Labs then became the official sponsor of the open source project.

In May 2016, Redis Labs announced a mechanism for developers to extend Redis, and opened an online marketplace that offers modules certified to work with both open source Redis and Redis' Enterprise products.

In August 2018, Redis Labs changed the license of its Redis modules from AGPL to Apache2 modified with Commons Clause.

In February 2019, Redis Labs changed the license of Redis modules to Redis Source Available License (RSAL).

In April 2019, Redis Labs acquired RDBTools, a graphical user interface to manage Redis from HashedIn. Later in the year, Redis Labs launched the tool as RedisInsight with expanded capabilities to visualize data in Redis modules.

Salvatore Sanfilippo stepped down as Redis's lead maintainer in the end of June 2020, leaving the project in the hands of Redis Labs.

On August 11, 2021, the company changed its name from Redis Labs to Redis, the name of its product, having acquired the intellectual property and trademark rights to Redis from Sanfilippo back in 2018.

On March 20, 2024, Redis went back on its promise of keeping the 3-clause BSD license and switched the open-source Redis project to a source-available license model.

Between June 15 and July 14, 2024, Redis relocated its headquarters from Mountain View, California to San Francisco, California.

The company’s Redis Enterprise platform is widely used, with tens of thousands of companies using their In-Memory Data Store products.

== Funding ==
The company secured $4 million in seed funding from angel investors in August 2012, an additional $9 million in series A funding led by Bain Capital Ventures and Carmel Ventures (now known as Viola Ventures), an additional $15m in Series B funding led by the existing investors and Silicon Valley Bank, and an additional $14 million in series C funding led by the same investors. In August 2017 it raised $44 million in series D funding led by Goldman Sachs Private Capital Investing, and in February 2019 $60 million in series E funding led by Francisco Partners with participation by existing investors. Series F funding was concluded in August 2020 raising another $100 million, with TCV joining as a new investor in the company. Another $110 million was raised in April 2021 and two new investors joined the company as part of Series G round, which was led by Tiger Global, with participation from SoftBank Vision Fund 2. Redis has raised a net amount of $347 million in funding to-date.

== Partnerships ==
Partnership	Year
Pivotal	June 2017
Red Hat	October 2018
Google Cloud	April 2019
Microsoft Azure	May 2020
