= Source-available software =

Software licensed to ensure access to source code

Source-available software is software released through a source code distribution model that includes arrangements where the source can be viewed, and in some cases modified, but without necessarily meeting the criteria to be called open-source. The licenses associated with the offerings range from allowing code to be viewed for reference to allowing code to be modified and redistributed for both commercial and non-commercial purposes.

Some source-available software licenses, classified as noncompete licenses, are closed-source software licenses that have been created by modifying an open-source software license to include a restriction that prohibits using the licensed software to compete with the developer. These anti-competitive restrictions create a vendor lock-in effect by steering users toward establishing a separate agreement with the developer for commercial use of the software.

== Distinction from free and open-source software ==
Any software is source-available in the broad sense as long as its source code is distributed along with it, even if the user has no legal rights to use, share, modify or even compile it. It is possible for a software to be both source-available software and proprietary software (e.g. id Software's Doom).

In contrast, the definitions of free software and open-source software are much narrower. Free software and/or open-source software is also always source-available software, but not all source-available software is also free software and/or open-source software. This is because the official definitions of those terms require considerable additional rights as to what the user can do with the available source (including, typically, the right to use said software, with attribution, in derived commercial products).

In the broad sense, any FOSS license is a source-available license. In the narrow sense, the term source-available specifically excludes FOSS software.

== Non-free licenses ==
The following source-available software licenses are considered non-free licenses because they have limitations that prevent them from being open-source according to the Open Source Initiative and free to the Free Software Foundation.

=== Commons Clause ===
The Commons Clause, created by Fossa, Inc., is an addendum to an open-source software license that restricts users from selling the software. Under the combined license, the software is source-available, but not open-source.

On 22 August 2018, Redis Labs shifted some Redis Modules from the GNU Affero General Public License to a combination of the Apache License 2.0 and the Commons Clause.

In September 2018, Matthew Garrett criticized Commons Clause calling it an "older way of doing things" and said it "doesn't help the commons".

=== Business Source License ===
Business Source License has been introduced by MariaDB Corporation in 2016 and rapidly became one of the most adopted "delayed open source" licenses. It prohibits use of the code in production environments, where a commercial license is required.

=== Functional Source License ===
Functional Source License has been introduced in November 2023 by Sentry, as a simpler alternative to Business Source License. It prohibits any "competing" use of the code, to preserve the rights of the author to economically exploit it, but applies for a limited time, after which the code itself is considered to be available under Apache License or MIT License.

=== GitLab Enterprise Edition License (EE License) ===
The GitLab Enterprise Edition License is used exclusively by GitLab's commercial offering. GitLab Inc. openly discloses that the EE License makes their Enterprise Edition product "proprietary, closed source code." GitLab also releases an open-source Community Edition under the MIT License. This makes GitLab an example of an open core company.

=== Mega Limited Code Review Licence ===
In 2016, Mega Ltd. released the source code of their Mega clients under the Mega Limited Code Review Licence, which only permits usage of the code "for the purposes of review and commentary". The source code was released before former director Kim Dotcom stated that he would "create a Mega competitor that is completely open source and non-profit" following his departure from Mega Ltd.

=== Microsoft Shared Source Initiative ===
Microsoft's Shared Source Initiative, launched in May 2001, comprises 5 licenses, 2 of which are open-source and 3 of which are restricted. The restricted licenses under this scheme are the Microsoft Limited Public License (Ms-LPL), the Microsoft Limited Reciprocal License (Ms-LRL), and the Microsoft Reference Source License (Ms-RSL).

=== Old Scilab License ===
Prior to version 5, Scilab described itself as "the open source platform for numerical computation" but had a license that forbade commercial redistribution of modified versions. Versions 5 and later are distributed under the GPL-compatible CeCILL license.

=== Server Side Public License ===
The Server Side Public License is a modification of the GNU Affero General Public License created by the MongoDB project. It modifies a clause relating to usage of the licensed work over a network, stating that if SSPL-licensed software is incorporated into a "service" offered to other users, the source code for the entirety of the service (including without limitation all software and APIs that would be required for a user to run an instance of the service themselves) must be released under the SSPL. The license is considered non-free by the Open Source Initiative, Debian and Red Hat, as it contains conditions that are unduly discriminatory towards commercial use of the software.

=== Open Compensation Token License ===
The Open Compensation Token License is commercial source-available software license. The key idea is to keep software extendable by everyone and to combine this with fair payment. Commercial uses of the software require commercial licensing and the funds are distributed via technical means to the contributors. The German company iunera created the license during a project to optimize public transport usage. The license works by registering source code artifacts as code tokens on the blockchain. Every developer who builds on prior software needs to register the dependencies that he or she uses via the blockchain. This ensures that the prior labor by other developers is acknowledged. Commercial applications require an obtaining a license via the blockchain. The license cost is computed as a percentage of the invested work hours. Licensing funds are distributed based on the dependencies to the code token owners via blockchain. Anyone who extends source code which is licensed with the Open Compensation Token License is required to use the same license. The license webpage is explicitly stating it is non Open Source.

=== SugarCRM Public License ===
In 2007 Michael Tiemann, president of OSI, had criticized companies such as SugarCRM for promoting their software as "open source" when in fact it did not have an OSI-approved license. In SugarCRM's case, it was because the software is so-called "badgeware" since it specified a "badge" that must be displayed in the user interface. SugarCRM's open source version was re-licensed under the GPL version 3 in 2007, and later the GNU Affero GPL version 3 in 2010.

=== TrueCrypt License ===
The TrueCrypt License was used by the TrueCrypt disk encryption utility. When TrueCrypt was discontinued, the VeraCrypt fork switched to the Apache License, but retained the TrueCrypt License for code inherited from TrueCrypt.

The Open Source Initiative rejects the TrueCrypt License, as "it has elements incompatible with the OSD." The Free Software Foundation criticizes the license for restricting who can execute the program, and for enforcing a trademark condition.

=== BeeGFS End User License Agreement ===
BeeGFS EULA is the license of the distributed parallel file system BeeGFS, except the client for Linux, which is licensed under GPLv2.

BeeGFS source code is publicly available from their website, and because of this they claim that BeeGFS as "Open-Source" software; it is in fact not because this license prohibits distributing modified versions of the software, or using certain features of the software without authorization.

== See also ==
- Comparison of free and open-source software licenses
- Free software
- Free-software license
- List of commercial video games with available source code
- List of proprietary source-available software
- List of source-available video games
- Open-core model
- Open-source license
- Open-source software
- Openwashing
- Open-weight model
- Shared Source Initiative
