= Seamoby =

Experimental internet layer protocol

The Seamoby Candidate Access Router Discovery, or CARD, is an experimental protocol outlined by RFC 4065 and RFC 4066.

The protocol is designed to speed up the hand over of IP devices between wireless access routers (AR). The protocol defines a mechanism that can be used by an access router to automatically discover its neighbor with help of mobile devices. Based on some trigger, mobile devices scan for neighbor access points (AP) and report list of newly found access point identifiers to the connected access router. The connected access router performs reverse look up using AP id(s) to identify the candidate access routers that are connected to the newfound access points. The connected access router updates its neighbor list with IP address and capability of newly found access routers. The neighbor list can be used for inter-AR handover decision making.

A similar idea is currently used by 3GPP SON protocol (a.k.a. ANR) for discovering candidate access points. However, ANR protocol extends RRC and X2 protocols to support CARD-like functionality for L2 networking.

The SEAMOBY working group was disbanded in fall 2004.
