= ICMP Router Discovery Protocol =

Protocol to discover routers

In computer networking, the ICMP Internet Router Discovery Protocol (IRDP), also called the Internet Router Discovery Protocol, is a protocol for computer hosts to discover the presence and location of routers on their IPv4 local area network. Router discovery is useful for accessing computer systems on other nonlocal area networks. The IRDP is defined by the IETF RFC 1256 standard, with the Internet Control Message Protocol (ICMP) upon which it is based defined in IETF RFC 792. IRDP eliminates the need to manually configure routing information.

== Router discovery messages ==
To enable router discovery, the IRDP defines two kinds of ICMP messages:

- The ICMP Router Solicitation message is sent from a computer host to any routers on the local area network to request that they advertise their presence on the network.
- The ICMP Router Advertisement message is sent by a router on the local area network to announce its IP address as available for routing.

When a host boots up, it sends solicitation messages to the IP multicast address 224.0.0.2. In response, one or more routers may send advertisement messages. If there is more than one router, the host usually picks the first message it gets and adds that router to its routing table. Independently of a solicitation, a router may periodically send out advertisement messages. These messages are not considered a routing protocol, as they do not determine a routing path, just the presence of possible gateways.

== Extensions ==
The IRDP strategy has been used in the development of the IPv6 Neighbor Discovery Protocol. These use ICMPv6 messages, the IPv6 analog of ICMP messages. Neighbor discovery is governed by IETF standards RFC 4861 and RFC 4862.

IRDP plays an essential role in mobile networking through IETF standard RFC 3344. This is called MIPv4 Agent discovery.

== See also ==
- Dynamic Host Configuration Protocol
