= Crescendo Networks =

Crescendo Networks, LTD.
- Company type: Privately held
- Industry: Technology
- Founded: 2002
- Headquarters: Sunnyvale, California
- Products: Application Delivery and Load Balancing
- Website: www.crescendonetworks.com

Crescendo Networks, Ltd. was a privately held computer networking company headquartered in Sunnyvale, California with regional offices in EMEA and APAC. Crescendo Networks is not to be confused with Crescendo Communications, Inc. a CDDI/FDDI network equipment manufacturer that Cisco Systems Inc. acquired in 1993.

Founded in 2002, Crescendo Networks manufactured and sold application delivery controllers which accelerate and optimize website and web application performance.

In August 2011, company assets have been acquired by F5 Networks through liquidation proceedings in Israel. A number of key Crescendo employees joined F5's office in Tel Aviv.

== Products ==
- AppBeat DC is a web-facing application delivery controller that helps web applications serve more users and traffic, faster, with fewer resources. It accelerates web applications by offloading and consolidating common CPU intensive tasks. The product's purpose-built platform uses separate and dedicated hardware engines for each feature with multiple network processors and Field Programmable Gate Arrays (FPGAs) to deliver features such as TCP multiplexing and connection management, load balancing, data compression, caching, SSL acceleration, and more.
- AppBeat SC is an application service controller designed to monitor multiple AppBeat DC application delivery controllers and provide insight into application behavior. It monitors and analyzes web applications and the state of the servers running them. The product gives users the option to be alerted via Twitter, as well as email or SNMP, if any degradation to their network is detected.
