= Content Vectoring Protocol =

In computer networks, Content Vectoring Protocol is a protocol for filtering data that is crossing a firewall into an external scanning device. An example of this is where all HTTP traffic is virus-scanned before being sent out to the user.

This protocol is identified as part of the Checkpoint training as being one of the benefits of their products. It is not known whether this is just a re-working of another protocol that has been re-branded by Checkpoint or if this is a generic Internet protocol.

Its default is to use TCP port 18181.

It is used separately by few servers implementing firewall to inspect the http content. It may or may not inspect the whole of the content, which is entirely based on the administrator managing the firewall. The administrator can direct the whole of the internet traffic to the content vectoring protocol or specific content coming from specific source to be inspected by the content vectoring protocol.

== RFC 3507 ==
The Internet Content Adaptation Protocol (ICAP) protocol outlined in RFC 3507 describes a protocol for content vectoring with HTTP.
