= Photuris (protocol) =

In computer networking, Photuris is a session key management protocol defined in RFC 2522.

Photuris is the Latin name of a genus of fireflies native to North America that mimic the signals of other firefly species. The name was chosen as a reference to the (classified) FIREFLY key exchange protocol developed by the National Security Agency and used in the STU-III secure telephone, which is believed to operate by similar principles.

== See also ==
- FIREFLY
