= Ping sweep =

In computing, a ping sweep is a method that can establish a range of IP addresses which map to live hosts.

The classic tool used for ping sweeps is fping, which traditionally was accompanied by gping to generate the list of hosts for large subnets, although more recent versions of fping include that functionality. Well-known tools with ping sweep capability include nmap for Unix and Windows systems, and the Pinger software from Rhino9 for Windows NT. There are many other tools with this capability, including: Hping, IEA's aping, Simple Nomad's ICMPEnum, SolarWind's Ping Sweep, and Foundstone's SuperScan. There is also a ping sweep tool for Windows, Mac, Linux, Android, and iOS called Fing made by Overlook Soft.

Pings can be detected by protocol loggers like ippl.
