= Carna botnet =

Botnet used to census the entire IPv4 internet

World map of 24-hour relative average utilization of IPv4 addresses observed using ICMP ping requests by Carna botnet, June - October 2012

The Carna botnet was a botnet of 420,000 devices created by an anonymous hacker to measure the extent of the Internet in what the creator called the “Internet Census of 2012”.

== Data collection ==
The data was collected by infiltrating Internet devices, especially routers, that used a default password or no password at all. It was named after Carna, "the Roman goddess for the protection of inner organs and health".

Collected data was compiled into a GIF portrait to display Internet use around the world over the course of 24 hours. The data gathered included only the IPv4 address space and not the IPv6 address space.

The Carna Botnet creator believes that with a growing number of IPv6 hosts on the Internet, 2012 may have been the last time a census like this was possible.

== Results ==
Of the 4.3 billion possible IPv4 addresses, Carna Botnet found a total of 1.3 billion addresses in use, including 141 million that were behind a firewall and 729 million that returned reverse domain name system records. The remaining 2.3 billion IPv4 addresses are probably not used.

An earlier first Internet census by the USDHS LANDER-study had counted 187 million visible Internet hosts in 2006.

== Further implications ==
The data provided by the Carna botnet was used by security researcher Morgan Marquis-Boire to determine in how many countries FinFisher spyware was being used. The use of such legally-gray data to conduct open source analysis raised questions for some, but Marquis-Boire expressed a belief that data is data. "I consider this more like rogue academia rather than criminal activity," he told Wired Magazine.

== Number of hosts by top level domain ==
Amongst other, Carna Botnet counted the number of hosts with reverse DNS names observed from May to October 2012. The top 20 Top Level Domains were:

Number of hosts	Top Level Domain
374,670,873	.net
199,029,228	.com
75,612,578	.jp
28,059,515	.it
28,026,059	.br
21,415,524	.de
20,552,228	.cn
17,450,093	.fr
17,363,363	.au
17,296,801	.ru
16,910,153	.mx
14,416,783	.pl
14,409,280	.nl
13,702,339	.edu
11,915,681	.ar
9,157,824	.ca
8,937,159	.uk
7,452,888	.se
7,243,480	.tr
6,878,625	.in

== See also ==
- BASHLITE
- Mirai (malware)
- Remaiten
- Linux.Darlloz
- Linux.Wifatch
- Hajime (malware)
