= Global internet usage =

Estimates of how many people use the internet

Number of internet users

Adoption of communication technologies

Share of individuals using the internet map

Global internet usage refers to the number of people who use the internet worldwide.

As of 2026, an estimated 6 billion people worldwide were using the internet, representing approximately 74 percent of the global population. This figure shows continued growth compared with the previous year's estimate of around 5.8 billion users. Despite this progress, significant disparities remain with about 2.2 billion people still offline, underscoring persistent digital divides related to economic development, affordability and infrastructure. Reports on global connectivity emphasize the need for expanded digital infrastructure, affordable services and digital skills training that ensures the expanding Internet access benefits a broader range of population worldwide.

== Internet users ==
As of 2025, the International Telecommunication Union (ITU) estimates that approximately 6 billion people, or 74% of the global population, are using the internet. This reflects a significant increase from 60% in 2020, with an estimated 1.3 billion individuals coming online during that five-year period. Despite this steady growth, a "digital divide" remains, leaving 2.2 billion people offline. The gap is particularly stark in low-income countries, where only 23% of the population uses the Internet, compared to 94% in high-income economies. This disparity in "meaningful connectivity" is increasingly defined by differences in connection speed, affordability, and digital skills.

Internet users per 100 inhabitants Source: International Telecommunication Union.

Template:Worldwide internet users

Internet users by region
Region	2005	2010	2017	2023
Africa	2%	10%	21.8%	37%
Americas	36%	49%	65.9%	87%
Arab States	8%	26%	43.7%	69%
Asia and Pacific	9%	23%	43.9%	66%
Commonwealth of Independent States	10%	34%	67.7%	89%
Europe	46%	67%	79.6%	91%

== Broadband usage ==
Worldwide broadband subscriptions
Users	2007	2010	2016	2019
World population	6.6 billion	6.9 billion	7.3 billion	7.75 billion
Fixed broadband	5%	8%	11.9%	14.5%
Developing world	2%	4%	8.2%	11.2%
Developed world	18%	24%	30.1%	33.6%
Mobile broadband	4%	11%	49.4%	83%
Developing world	1%	4%	40.9%	75.2%
Developed world	19%	43%	90.3%	121.7%

Broadband subscriptions by region
Subscription	Place	2007	2010	2014	2019
Fixed	Africa	0.1%	0.2%	0.4%	0.4%
Fixed	Americas	11%	14%	17%	22%
Fixed	Arab States	1%	2%	3%	8.1%
Fixed	Asia and Pacific	3%	6%	8%	14.4%
Fixed	Commonwealth of Independent States	2%	8%	14%	19.8%
Fixed	Europe	18%	24%	28%	31.9%
Mobile	Africa	0.2%	2%	19%	34%
Mobile	Americas	6%	23%	59%	104.4%
Mobile	Arab States	0.8%	5%	25%	67.3%
Mobile	Asia and Pacific	3%	7%	23%	89%
Mobile	Commonwealth of Independent States	0.2%	22%	49%	85.4%
Mobile	Europe	15%	29%	64%	97.4%

Fixed broadband internet subscriptions in 2012 as a percentage of a country's population Source: International Telecommunication Union.

Mobile broadband internet subscriptions in 2012 as a percentage of a country's population Source: International Telecommunication Union.

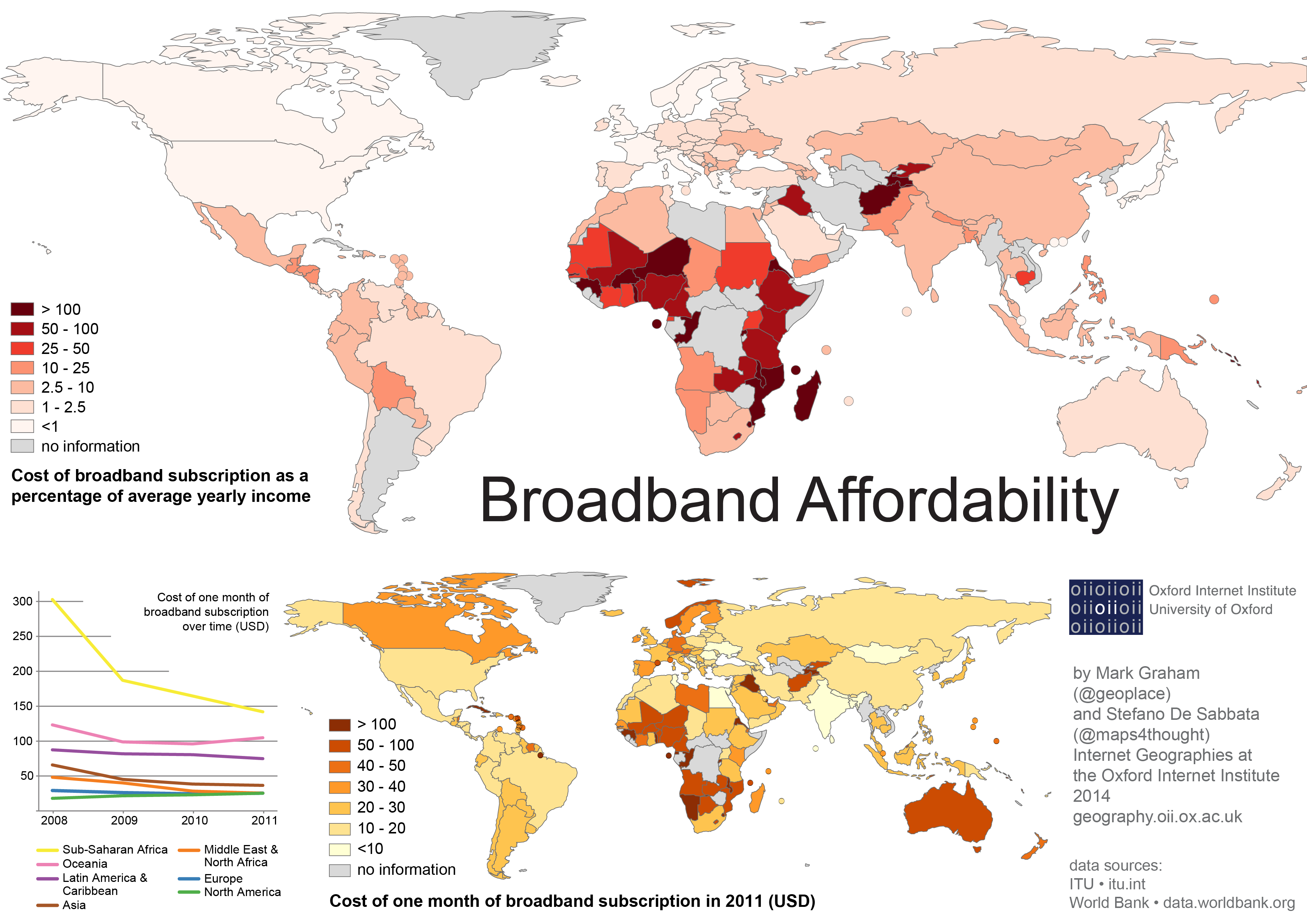
Broadband affordability in 2011 This map presents an overview of broadband affordability, as the relationship between average yearly income per capita and the cost of a broadband subscription (data referring to 2011). Source: Information Geographies at the Oxford Internet Institute.

== Internet hosts ==
The Internet Systems Consortium provides account for the number of the worldwide number of IPv4 hosts (see below). In 2019, this internet domain survey was discontinued as it does not account for IPv6 hosts, and therefore might be misleading.

Source: Internet Systems Consortium.

== Web index ==
The Web index is a composite statistic designed and produced by the World Wide Web Foundation. It provides a multi-dimensional measure of the World Wide Web's contribution to development and human rights globally. It covers 86 countries as of 2014, the latest year for which the index has been compiled. The 2020 edition of the Foundation-affiliated Alliance for Affordable Internet's Affordability Drivers Index, which it describes as benefiting from the research framework established by the Web Index, covered 72 countries. It incorporates indicators that assess the areas of universal access, freedom and openness, relevant content, and empowerment, which indicate economic, social, and political impacts of the Web.

Map showing the score of the countries included in the Web index.

== IPv4 addresses ==
The Carna Botnet was a botnet of 420,000 devices created by hackers to measure the extent of the internet in what the creators called the "Internet Census of 2012".

World map of 24-hour relative average utilization of IPv4 addresses observed using ICMP ping requests as part of the Internet Census of 2012 (Carna Botnet), June – October 2012. Key: from red (high), to yellow, green (average), light blue, and dark blue (low).

== Languages ==
Content languages for websites

Percentage of internet users by language

== Censorship and surveillance ==
Internet censorship and surveillance by country (2018): Pervasive censorship and/or surveillance Substantial censorship and/or surveillance Selective censorship and/or surveillance / Little or no censorship and/or surveillance Not classified / No data; Sources: Freedom on the Net, OpenNet Initiative, Reporters Without Borders.

== See also ==
- A4AI: affordability threshold
- Digital rights
- Internet access
- Internet traffic
- List of countries by internet connection speeds
- List of countries by number of mobile phones in use
- List of social networking services
- Zettabyte Era
