= Metulji botnet =

Computer botnet

The Metulji botnet, discovered in June 2011, is a botnet mainly involved in cyberscamming and denial of service attacks. Before the botnet itself was dismantled, it consisted of over 12 million individual zombie computers infected with the "Butterfly Bot", making it, as of June 2011, the largest known botnet.

It is not known what type of computers are vulnerable, or how to tell if a computer is a part of this botnet.

== See also ==
- Carna botnet
- Command and control (malware)
- Computer worm
- Spambot
- Timeline of notable computer viruses and worms
- Xor DDoS
- Zombie (computer science)
- ZeroAccess botnet
