= Bliss (computer virus) =

Linux computer virus

Malware details
- Isolation date: 1997

Technical details
- Platform: Linux

Bliss is a computer virus, introduced in 1997, which aims to infect Linux systems. When executed, it attempts to attach itself to Linux executable files, to which regular users do not have access. In the case of the alpha version, this prevents the executables from running, so users notice it immediately. Although it was probably intended to prove that Linux can be infected, it does not propagate very effectively because of the structure of Linux's user privilege system. The Bliss virus never became widespread, and remains chiefly a research curiosity. After the Staog virus it is the second known Linux virus.

When the Bliss virus was released, antivirus software vendors and Linux distributions released security advisories to notify users of the potential risks. Debian still lists itself as vulnerable to the Bliss virus. However, due to the requirement for infection to occur under the root user, the risk is listed as minimal.

== See also ==
- Linux malware
