= LMD =

LMD may stand for:

- Laser capture microdissection
- Leptomeningeal disease
- Life Model Decoy, a fictional android in Marvel Comics
- Linux Malware Detect
- Lithuanian Mathematical Society (Lithuanian: Lietuvos matematikų draugija, LMD)
- Le Monde Diplomatique a periodical of international current affairs publishing in multiple languages.
- LMD (magazine), a Sri Lankan business magazine
- Bachelor's master's doctorate system (in France réforme licence-master-doctorat or réforme LMD), a European educational system
