= List of sovereign states by number of Internet hosts =

Number of Internet hosts worldwide: 1969-2018 Source: Internet Systems Consortium.

This is the list of countries by number of Internet hosts, based on 2012 figures from the CIA World Factbook. Several dependent territories, not fully recognized states, and non-state territories are also listed. The European Union host (.eu) is mostly composed of French, Polish and German hosts.

== List ==
(*) The U.S. figure includes hosts in the .us, .mil, .gov, .edu, .com, .org, and .net domains.

Rank	Country	Internet hosts
—	Total	903,909,315
1	United States*	505,000,000
2	Japan	64,453,000
3	Brazil	26,577,000
4	Italy	25,662,000
5	China	20,602,000
6	Germany	20,043,000
7	France	17,266,000
8	Australia	17,081,000
9	Mexico	16,233,000
10	Russia	14,865,000
11	Netherlands	13,699,000
12	Poland	13,265,000
13	Argentina	11,232,000
14	Canada	8,743,000
15	United Kingdom	8,107,000
16	Turkey	7,093,000
17	India	6,746,000
18	Taiwan	6,272,000
19	Sweden	5,978,000
20	Switzerland	5,301,000
21	Belgium	5,192,000
22	Finland	4,763,000
23	South Africa	4,761,000
24	Colombia	4,410,000
25	Denmark	4,297,000
26	Spain	4,228,000
27	Czech Republic	4,148,000
28	Portugal	3,748,000
29	Norway	3,588,000
30	Austria	3,512,000
31	Thailand	3,399,000
32	Greece	3,201,000
33	Hungary	3,145,000
34	New Zealand	3,026,000
35	Romania	2,667,000
36	Israel	2,483,000
37	Ukraine	2,173,000
38	Chile	2,152,000
39	Singapore	1,960,000
40	Ireland	1,387,000
41	Slovakia	1,384,000
42	Indonesia	1,344,000
43	Lithuania	1,205,000
44	Serbia	1,102,000
45	Uruguay	1,036,000
46	Venezuela	1,016,000
47	Bulgaria	976,277
48	Hong Kong	870,041
49	Estonia	865,494
50	Croatia	729,420
51	Moldova	711,564
52	Philippines	425,812
53	Malaysia	422,470
54	Slovenia	415,581
55	Dominican Republic	404,500
56	Iceland	369,969
57	Pakistan	365,813
58	Latvia	359,604
59	Georgia	357,864
60	Guatemala	357,552
61	United Arab Emirates	337,804
62	South Korea	315,697
63	Nicaragua	296,068
64	Belarus	295,217
65	Paraguay	280,658
66	Morocco	277,338
67	Cyprus	252,013
68	Luxembourg	250,900
69	Trinidad and Tobago	241,690
70	Peru	234,102
71	Egypt	200,430
72	Iran	197,804
73	Armenia	194,142
74	Vietnam	189,553
75	Bolivia	180,988
76	Ecuador	170,538
77	Bosnia and Herzegovina	155,252
78	Costa Rica	147,258
79	Saudi Arabia	145,941
80	Tuvalu	145,158
81	Kyrgyzstan	115,573
82	Mozambique	89,737
83	Niue	79,508
84	Namibia	78,280
85	British Indian Ocean Territory	75,006
86	Turks and Caicos Islands	73,217
87	Bangladesh	71,164
88	Kenya	71,018
89	Jordan	69,473
90	Kazakhstan	67,464
91	Lebanon	64,926
92	North Macedonia	62,826
93	Ghana	59,086
94	Uzbekistan	56,075
95	Mauritius	51,139
96	Brunei	49,457
97	Bahrain	47,727
98	Azerbaijan	46,856
99	Cocos (Keeling) Islands	42,820
100	Nepal	41,256
101	Aruba	40,560
102	Madagascar	38,392
103	French Polynesia	37,949
104	New Caledonia	34,231
105	Yemen	33,206
106	Uganda	32,683
107	Honduras	30,955
108	Zimbabwe	30,615
109	Andorra	28,383
110	Tanzania	26,074
111	Monaco	26,009
112	Guyana	24,936
113	El Salvador	24,070
114	Cayman Islands	23,472
115	Fiji	21,739
116	Angola	20,703
117	Bahamas	20,661
118	Mongolia	20,084
119	Bermuda	20,040
120	Samoa	18,013
121	Libya	17,926
122	Zambia	16,571
123	Greenland	15,645
124	Albania	15,528
125	Malta	14,754
126	Bhutan	14,590
127	Oman	14,531
128	Liechtenstein	14,278
129	Cambodia	13,784
130	Antigua and Barbuda	11,532
131	Lesotho	11,030
132	Panama	11,022
133	San Marino	11,015
134	Cameroon	10,207
135	Montenegro	10,088
136	Sri Lanka	9,552
137	Cote d'Ivoire	9,115
138	Nauru	8,162
139	Antarctica	7,764
140	Faroe Islands	7,575
141	Saint Helena, Ascension and Tristan da Cunha	6,729
142	Tajikistan	6,258
143	Vanuatu	5,655
144	Tonga	5,367
145	Papua New Guinea	5,006
146	U.S. Virgin Islands	4,790
147	Federated States of Micronesia	4,668
148	Solomon Islands	4,370
149	Jamaica	3,906
150	Cook Islands	3,562
151	Gibraltar	3,509
152	Belize	3,392
153	Maldives	3,296
154	Cuba	3,244
155	Christmas Island	3,028
156	Kuwait	2,771
157	Wallis and Futuna	2,760
158	Swaziland	2,744
159	Democratic Republic of the Congo	2,515
160	Montserrat	2,431
161	American Samoa	2,387
162	Tokelau	2,069
163	Botswana	1,806
164	Burkina Faso	1,795
165	Sao Tome and Principe	1,678
166	Laos	1,532
167	Barbados	1,524
168	Rwanda	1,447
169	Nigeria	1,234
170	Togo	1,168
171	Malawi	1,099
172	Burma	1,055
173	Qatar	897
174	Isle of Man	895
175	Dominica	723
176	Turkmenistan	714
177	Eritrea	701
178	Algeria	676
179	Gambia	656
180	Tunisia	576
181	Haiti	555
182	British Virgin Islands	505
183	Benin	491
184	South Georgia and the South Sandwich Islands	470
185	Puerto Rico	469
186	Niger	454
187	Mali	437
188	Syria	416
189	Macau	327
189	Kiribati	327
191	Saint Vincent and the Grenadines	305
192	Sierra Leone	282
193	Anguilla	269
194	Jersey	264
195	Timor-Leste	252
196	Seychelles	247
197	Guernsey	239
198	Senegal	237
199	Burundi	229
200	Afghanistan	223
201	Djibouti	215
202	Suriname	188
203	Somalia	186
204	Ethiopia	179
205	Norfolk Island	128
206	Gabon	127
207	Falkland Islands	110
208	Vatican City	107
209	Heard Island and McDonald Islands	102
210	Saint Lucia	100
211	Sudan	99
212	Guinea-Bissau	90
213	Grenada	80
214	Saint Kitts and Nevis	54
215	French Southern and Antarctic Lands	53
216	Republic of the Congo	45
217	Cape Verde	38
218	Pitcairn Islands	26
218	Iraq	26
220	Guam	23
221	Mauritania	22
222	Central African Republic	20
223	Northern Mariana Islands	17
224	Guinea	15
224	Saint Pierre and Miquelon	15
226	Comoros	14
227	North Korea	8
228	Equatorial Guinea	7
228	Liberia	7
230	Chad	6
230	Bouvet Island	6
232	Palau	4
233	Marshall Islands	3

== See also ==
- Carna botnet
