= Global Reach =

Global Reach refers to a business initiative to increase the access between a company and their current and potential customers through the use of the Internet. The Internet allows the company to market themselves and attract new customers to their website where they can provide product information and better customer service. Customers can place orders electronically, therefore reducing expensive long distant phone calls and postage costs of placing orders, while saving time on behalf of the customer and company.

A company striving to obtain Global Reach should provide a code of ethics, a company purchasing policy, additional contact information, adequate product information and price. The website itself should be multi-lingual, easy-to-use, and have the ability to secure customer information.

== Impact of globalisation ==
The prominence of global reach comes as a result of globalisation which has seen the indefinite increase in worldwide communication. The term ‘global reach’ which refers to this communication is suggestive of the fact that firms are increasingly looking to expand overseas by connecting with customers that they may otherwise have been unable to. The relentless innovation of technology is allowing companies to become "more global in their activities…as capital moves more freely across borders". Now, many companies have adapted their online forums such as websites to appeal to their growing global customer base. The internet has been key in growing advertising for firms. The online forum has often proven to be cheaper for establishments than billboard or television advertising as was common before the substantial increase in technology as a means of business expansion. According to statistics, global internet usage has increased from c.8 in 2001 to c40.4 inhabitants per 100 in 2014, suggesting that the market reachable by companies via the internet has grown.

== A means of business growth ==
Global Reach acts as a medium through which firms can expand beyond the region of their setup. The concept has meant that smaller firms are able to use the internet to reach markets that would only have been available to the larger firms before. The modern ability and desire of companies to grow globally means that management teams are tasked with monitoring teams and employees who may be based abroad. Global Reach refers to the growing need for communication between these firm factions. While telephone calls are common, firms are increasingly turning to emails namely for time efficiency which allows business to grow as it becomes faster to carry out requests of customers and executives within the company. The time efficiency involved in online communication between the firm and customers and transactions allows for business to move faster and for companies to concentrate their energy in other sectors. With the economic environment constantly altering, businesses need to find ways to move forward alongside new technologies. However, failing to keep up with technological advances can cause firms to lose out to competitors which may use these technical benefits more efficiently.

== Wider benefits ==
Whilst the above improvements have proven vital and beneficial to firms, consumers have also enjoyed the rewards of such expansion through cheaper pricing due to increased competition, access to a wider array of goods and better quality products due to the ability of firms to contact a bigger range of suppliers. Popular online sale sites which have become a staple of the internet due to Global Reach initiatives has also allowed the general public to access foreign markets, most commonly those of small home-run firms. The economic concept of the multiplier affect applies in some such cases as domestic markets can prosper directly through the opportunities provided by Global Reach. Firms have also embraced the internet to enabling the user to access their websites in several languages and in cases of online retail, allowing the customer to view the products with the price tag in the appropriate currency. Businesses can use the internet to come closer to their customers. Most firm websites provide contact information for its users allowing consumers unprecedented access into the firm, helping the business to establish a loyal consumer base. Other small businesses can also benefit from one firm’s decision to move forward technologically. The internet allows businesses to publish its information to be available on a public front, potentially aiding start-up firms to review potential aims and target market. Especially relevant in the face of emerging concerns for climate change, businesses are under pressure to look forward to more environmentally sustainable means of growth, for example the availability of email as a means of contact reduces the environmental strain on paper use.

== See also ==
- Globalization
- The Global Economy
