= Rkhunter =

Unix-based computer security tool

rkhunter
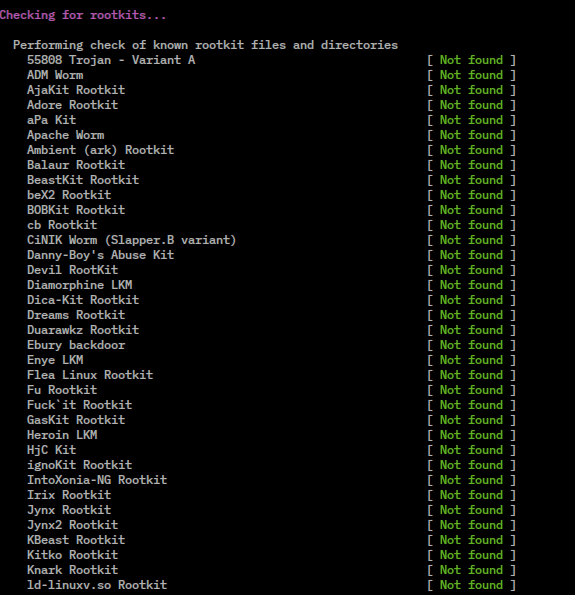
- rkhunter on Linux
- Release: 2006; 20 years ago
- Stable release: 1.4.6 / 20 February 2018; 8 years ago
- Written in: Bourne shell, Perl
- Operating system: Unix-like
- Type: rootkit detector
- License: GNU General Public License
- Website: sourceforge.net/projects/rkhunter/
- Repository: git.code.sf.net/p/rkhunter/rkh_code

rkhunter (Rootkit Hunter) is a Unix-based tool that scans for rootkits, backdoors and possible local exploits. It does this by comparing SHA-1 hashes of important files with known good ones in online databases, searching for default directories (of rootkits), wrong permissions, hidden files, suspicious strings in kernel modules, and special tests for Linux and FreeBSD. rkhunter is notable due to its inclusion in popular operating systems (Fedora, Debian, etc.)

The tool has been written in Bourne shell, to allow for portability. It can run on almost all UNIX-derived systems.

== Development ==
In 2003, developer Michael Boelen released the first version of Rootkit Hunter. After several years of development, in early 2006, he agreed to hand over development to a development team. Since that time, eight people have been working to set up the project properly and work towards the much-needed maintenance release. The project has since been moved to SourceForge.

Both the GitHub and the SourceForge web resources seem to be sponsored by 'dogsbody' while code work seems to be being carried out by John Horne. This appears to be 'work-in-progress' but caution for Website spoofing and similar should always be exercised.

== See also ==
- chkrootkit
- Lynis
- OSSEC
- Samhain (software)
- Host-based intrusion detection system comparison
- Hardening (computing)
- Linux malware
- Rootkit
