= GoAntiques =

- Company type: Private company
- Industry: Retail
- Founded: 1994; 32 years ago
- Headquarters: Portland, Oregon, United States
- Products: Antiques, collectibles, art
- Website: www.goantiques.com

GoAntiques is an American online retail and auction market place for antiques and collectibles. The company was founded as an Antique Networking business in 1994 and is based in the Portland, Oregon area.

GoAntiques inventory consists of antique, collectible, art, and other merchandise for sale by member dealers. Along with TIAS.com, and Ruby Lane it was long ago considered one of the 3 major American online antique malls. As of July 2014, the site lists more than 400,000 items from 1,800 dealers in 29 countries.

== History ==
Antique Networking, Inc. was founded in Ohio in 1994 by Kathy Kamnikar, and began operating online by June 1995. It began operating under the domain antiqnet.com in 1996 and in that year was listed by the Chicago Tribune as one of 8 dominant online services (alongside historical auction houses Sotheby's and Christie's). Antique Networking merged with Baton Rouge, Louisiana-based GoAntiques in 2001 and began operating under the goantiques.com domain.

In 2003 the company moved headquarters from Baton Rouge to Columbus, Ohio under Chapter 11 Reorganization.

In October 2008, antiques and collectibles research company WorthPoint acquired GoAntiques.

In May 2015, online social marketplace Gemr acquired GoAntiques. Gemr later divested itself of the GoAntiques site.
