= TIAS.com =

American online antiques retail marketplace

- Type: Private
- Industry: Retail
- Founded: 1995; 31 years ago
- Headquarters: Garden City, New York, United States
- Key people: Phillip Davies, President & CEO
- Products: Antiques, collectibles
- Website: www.tias.com

TIAS (The Internet Antique Shop) is an American online retail marketplace for antiques and collectibles. The company was founded in 1995 and is based in Garden City, New York. The company is privately held.

The company's inventory consists of antiques and collectibles for retail sale by member dealers. TIAS runs additional internet properties related to the antiques and collectibles trade including curioscape.com, antiquearts.com and collectoronline.com. The company also operates earthling.com where non-antique and collectible items may be listed by members.

Along with GoAntiques and Ruby Lane, Tias is considered one of the 3 major online antique malls. As of 2014, the site listed more than 490,000 items from thousands of dealers in the United States and Canada.

== History ==
TIAS has been online since April 1995 and was an early provider of member inventory to eBay.

In 1996 TIAS acquired CyberAntiquemall.com.

In 2000 TIAS acquired online antique mall, AntiqueArts.com.

In 2003 TIAS.com acquired online antique mall, CollectorOnline, from AOL.

In 2008 TIAS.com acquired 400 merchants from Architecturals.net.

In 2012 TIAS.com acquired 250 merchants from Tabletopsetc.com.
