= Ruby Lane =

Online retail store

- Company type: S-Corp
- Industry: Retail
- Founded: 1998
- Headquarters: San Francisco, California, United States
- Key people: Tom Johnson, President & CEO
- Products: Antiques, collectibles, art, jewelry
- Website: www.rubylane.com

Ruby Lane, founded in 1998, is a vintage online retail store based around independent member traders.

== History ==
In 1998, Ruby Lane was founded by Tom Johnson and Jim Wilcoxson in San Francisco and named after Johnson's mother, Ruby. In 1998, Tom was collecting 1950s dishes and found it cumbersome to complete a set. As the Internet was in its infancy, searching for shops online was difficult and often proved fruitless.

From there, the idea was hatched to create an easy-to-use online community of shops that showcase antiques and collectibles. In 1999, Ruby Lane, along with BiddersEdge and AuctionWatch, were involved in a notable disagreement with eBay over 3rd-party sites indexing eBay listings. In 2005, Wilcoxson departed from the company, leaving Johnson as president and CEO.

The tagline “Vintage Begins Here” was introduced in 2013.

In 2019, Ruby Lane won Best Communications, Customer Service (a distinction achieved in seven of the 10 Seller's Choice Awards), and Most Recommended Site from ECommerceBytes. Additionally, the site ranked 2nd overall in 2019. In 2021, the site came in 3rd for the Seller's Choice award.

In 2020, the site's sales sharply increased after the onset of the COVID-19 pandemic. The site began co-hosting online shopping as some antique stores and festivals were forced to cancel their in-person events.

== Description ==
Ruby Lane sells antiques, vintage collectibles, vintage fashion, jewelry, dolls, and art for sale by independent member dealers. Jewelry accounts for about half of the site's sales. Ruby Lane sells items at set prices rather than in an auction format, and the company does take commissions from sales.

Each Ruby Lane shop is reviewed by an in-house team of art and antique professionals and must meet specified standards before opening for business. Open shops are required to follow an ongoing set of quality guidelines intended to help ensure that items listed for sale are genuine and accurately represented.

Along with GoAntiques and TIAS.com, Ruby Lane is considered one of the three major online vintage and antique marketplaces.

As of February 2020, the site lists more than 575,000 items from more than 2,000 dealers around the world.
