= SaneBox =

Email sorting software

- Company type: Private
- Founded: 2010 (beta)
- Headquarters: Boston, Massachusetts, and Venice, California, U.S.
- Key people: Stuart Roseman, Founder & CEO
- Services: Email management software
- Website: www.sanebox.com
- Content license: Subscription

SaneBox is an email management software as a service that integrates with IMAP and Exchange Web Services (EWS) email accounts. Its primary function is to filter email messages that it deems unimportant into a folder for later processing.

== History ==
SaneBox is a self-funded company with locations in Boston, Massachusetts, and Venice, California. It was founded by Stuart Roseman in 2010 in response to articles written by Bijan Sabet, Fred Wilson (financier) and Michael Arrington. As an entrepreneur, Roseman previously founded and sold other companies, including Gamesville and Gamelogic. In 2012, SaneBox announced SaneBox for Business in a shift toward becoming more business-to-business focused.

== Operation ==
SaneBox integrates with a user’s email server and analyzes past email usage in order to infer what emails are important. Messages deemed important remain in the inbox, while those deemed unimportant are filtered into a different folder for later reference. The algorithms and filtering are primarily based on the email sender, the subject line and the timestamp. A second type of filtering deletes incoming emails from designated senders, a feature that is intended to serve a similar purpose to unsubscribing from email lists. Other functions of the service including "snoozing," or deferring, emails, and a Dropbox integration that moves email attachments of a certain size into Dropbox and replaces them with the Dropbox link. Similar attachment support is available for Box, Evernote, Google Drive and IBM SmartCloud.
