= Linux.Darlloz =

Computer worm for Linux IoT devices

- Operating system: Linux
- Type: Botnet

Linux.Darlloz is a worm which infects Linux embedded systems.

Linux.Darlloz was first discovered by Symantec in 2013. Linux.Darlloz targets the Internet of things and infects routers, security cameras, set-top boxes by exploiting a PHP vulnerability.

The worm was based on a Proof of concept code that was released in October 2013. Linux.Darlloz utilizes vulnerability (CVE-2012-1823) to exploit systems in order to compromise systems.

Linux.Darlloz was later found in March 2014 to have started mining crypto currencies such as Mincoin and Dogecoin.

== See also ==
- Botnet
- Mirai (malware)
- BASHLITE
- Remaiten
- Linux.Wifatch
- Hajime (malware)
