= Alliance for Affordable Internet =

Initiative to make the Internet more affordable

Alliance for Affordable Internet (A4AI)
- Type: Global Coalition
- Founded: 2013
- Headquarters: Washington, D.C.
- Area served: Asia Pacific, Africa, and Latin America
- Key people: Sonia Jorge (Executive Director), Eleanor Sarpong (Deputy Director & Policy Lead)
- Products: Affordability Report, Affordability Drivers Index, Mobile Broadband Pricing, Mobile Device Pricing
- Services: Public comments, technical assistance
- Website: a4ai.org

The Alliance for Affordable Internet (A4AI) is an initiative to make the Internet more affordable to people around the world. The World Wide Web Foundation serves as the Secretariat, and major members of coalition include Google, the Omidyar Network, the Department for International Development (UK), USAID, Facebook, Cisco, Intel, Microsoft, UN Women and many others from the public, private and civil society sectors.

== History ==
=== Purpose ===
A4AI was created with the goal of obtaining global broadband internet access priced at less than 5% of average per capita income globally; the target of the UN Broadband Commission. It cites the lack of investment in infrastructure, competition in the market, and inefficient taxation, amongst other policy and regulatory obstacles, as being major constraints to reducing prices.

It claims the internet as being an essential source of information and services for all and advocates an open, competitive broadband and telecommunications market, regulated by an independent agency. Particular attention is paid to internet freedom and the rights of online expression.

It works closely with governments and local stakeholders in Africa, Asia, and Latin America on policy and regulatory reform through a combination of advocacy, research and knowledge-sharing activities.

=== Launch ===
The initiative was officially launched on October 7, 2013, at the "Commonwealth Telecommunications Organisation Forum" in Abuja, Nigeria. The launch was covered by many news sources.

== Reception ==
A4AI was briefly discussed in relation to Internet.org, a Facebook-led initiative for Internet accessibility, by David Talbot in an article for Technology Review.

== 1 for 2 target ==
The A4AI has also coined the term "affordability threshold" in its "1 for 2 target". It considers the affordability threshold to be at 1GB of mobile broadband data priced at 2% or less of average monthly income. The UN Broadband Commission has adopted the “1 for 2” target as the new standard for affordable internet.

== Criticism ==
Michael Gurstein wrote a critical article about A4AI in which he raised concern that the organisation was more about encouraging Less Developed Countries (LDCs) to adopt neoliberal policies than actually getting "affordable access". Quoting their documentation, he says that they advocate a set of "guiding principles" for adoption as policy and regulatory practice by the LDCs. These, he argues, all rest on neoliberal assumptions, rather than allowing them to be tested alongside other ways of looking at things. Whilst these guidelines include an evidence-based approach, Gurstein argues that if all the research is carried out on neoliberal assumptions the results will be highly pre-determined by the input principles.

He raises concern that this approach will allow for private companies to exploit making developments in the more readily reliable markets of the urban environment, while extending such services to less viable rural markets will be left to inadequately funded public initiatives. He further points to the championing of the use of Universal Service Fund facilities (a structure promoted by the World Bank), which often attract million or even billion dollar budgets but where control is retained by private service providers and which often do not match local needs. This leads to his claim that a major priority for A4AI is that LDC governments adopt neoliberal policies as outlined in their guiding principles.

== See also ==
- Internet.org
- Project Loon
- O3b Networks
