= Red Cross data breach =

2022 cybersecurity incident

On 20 January 2022, the International Committee of the Red Cross made an appeal to hackers who had stolen private data, saying they would speak "directly and confidentially" to those responsible for the attack. The hackers had stolen private data on more than 515,000 vulnerable people from at least 60 Red Cross and Red Crescent societies. The data belonged to individuals whose information was stored as part of the Red Cross and Red Crescent Movement’s Restoring Family Links programme, which helps reconnect people separated by conflict, disaster, migration and other crises. So far there is no proof that the data has been leaked, but the ICRC said that their gravest concern was the risk posed by exposing the data.

The attackers targeted servers used by the ICRC (initially thought to be hosted by a third‑party contractor) and accessed sensitive personal data, including names, contact details, locations, and other identifying information. The attack was aimed at a Swiss contractor that stored the data.

The perpetrators have not been identified. The ICRC described the attack as "highly sophisticated" and comparable in profile to state‑sponsored operations, although no direct attribution has been established. They said the breach occurred through an unpatched critical vulnerability in authentication software, which allowed the attackers to compromise administrator credentials and move within ICRC systems to exfiltrate data.

== Impact ==
The ICRC has suspended access to compromised computer systems which are part of the Restoring Family Links programme, which was targeted in the attack. A spokesman said "We will do our utmost to ensure some business continuity and a resumption of services as soon as possible".
