= Default password =

Password for devices on factory default settings

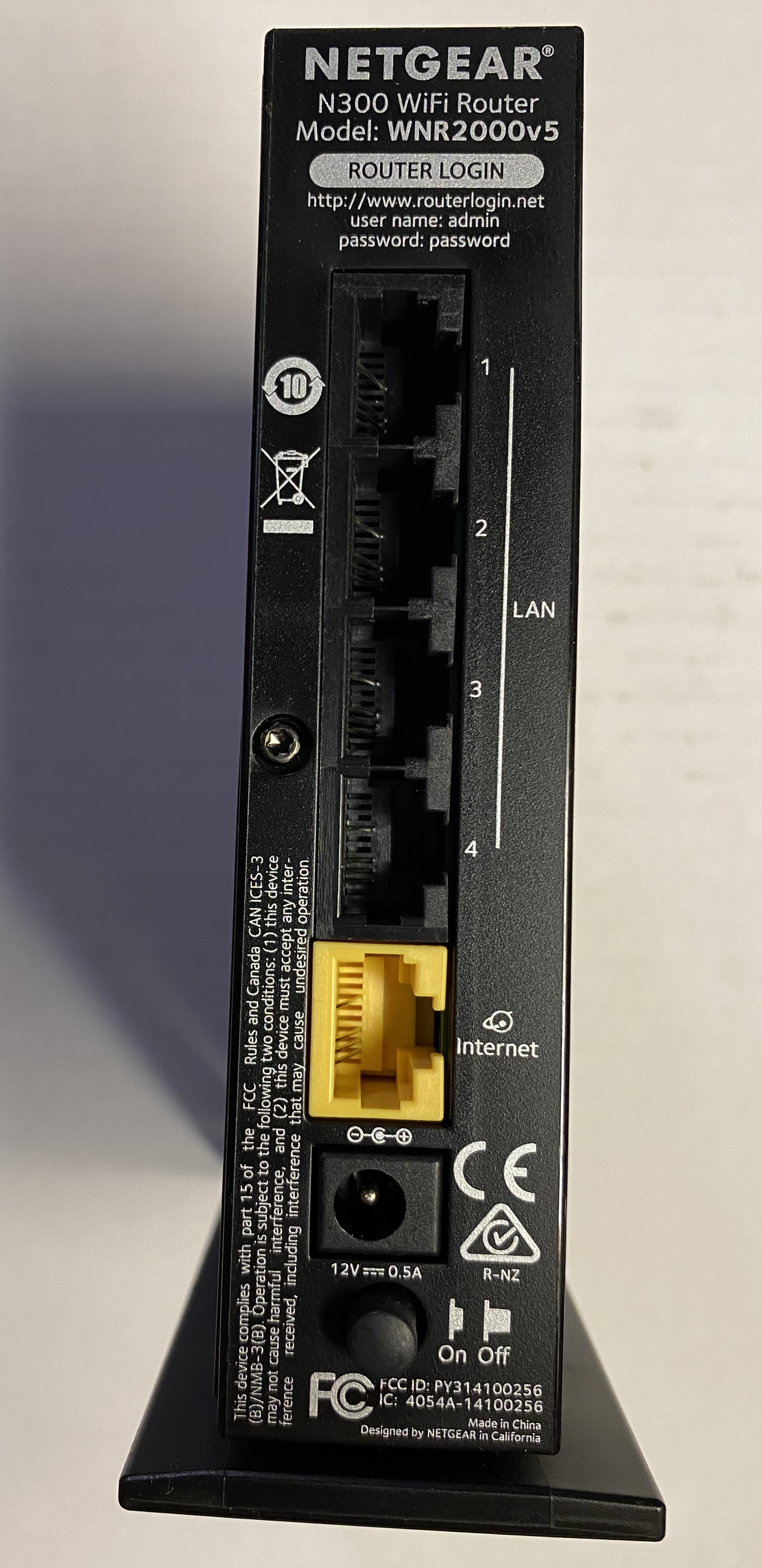
WiFi Router with default username "admin" and default password "password"

Where a device needs a username and/or password to log in, a default password is usually provided to access the device during its initial setup, or after resetting it to the factory default settings.

Manufacturers of such equipment typically use a simple password, such as admin or password on all equipment they ship, expecting users to change the password during configuration. The default username and password are usually found in the instruction manual (common for all devices) or on the device itself.

Default passwords are one of the major contributing factors to large-scale compromises of home routers. Leaving such a password on devices available to the public is a major security risk. Several Proof-of-Concept (POC) demonstrations were made, and active "worms" ran across the Internet searching for systems having the default username and password. Voyager Alpha Force, Zotob, and MySpooler are a few examples of POC malware which scan the Internet for specific devices and try to log in using default credentials.

In the real world, many forms of malware, such as Mirai, have used this vulnerability. Once devices have been compromised by exploiting the Default Credential vulnerability, they can themselves be used for various harmful purposes, such as carrying out Distributed Denial of Service (DDoS) attacks. In one incident, a hacker gained access and control of a large number of networks including those of University of Maryland, Baltimore County, Imagination, and Capital Market Strategies L, simply because they hadn't changed their NetGear switches from the default credentials.

Some devices (such as wireless routers) have unique default router usernames and passwords printed on a sticker, which is more secure than a common default password. However, some vendors derived the unique default passwords from the device's MAC addresses using a known algorithm, and attackers easily computed the same passwords.

== See also ==
- Backdoor (computing)
- Cyber-security regulation
- Internet of things
