= Badbunny =

Multi-platform computer worm

Badbunny, also known as SB/Bad Bunny-A (Sophos) and StarOffice/Bad Bunny (McAfee), is a multi-platform computer worm written in several scripting languages and distributed as an OpenOffice.org document, commonly named "badbunny.odg", containing a macro written in Star Basic.

Discovered on May 21, 2007, the worm spreads itself by dropping malicious script files that affect the behavior of popular IRC programs mIRC and X-Chat, causing it to send the worm to other users.

== Effects ==
If the macro is opened from the affected document, it displays the following message: "Title: ///BadBunny\\\" Body: "Hey '[USERNAME]' you like my BadBunny?" and loads one of four different scripts named badbunny.js (JS.Badbunny) under Windows, badbunny.pl (Perl.Badbunny) under Linux/Unix, or either badbunny.rb or badbunnya.rb (Ruby.Badbunny) under Mac OS X. Upon loading, the user is shown a pornographic image of a man dressed as a rabbit having sex with a scantily clad woman in the woods.
