= BASHLITE =

2014 computer malware

Malware details
- Technical name: As BashLite: Backdoor.Linux.BASHLITE.[letter] (Trend Micro); As Gafgyt: ELF/Gafgyt.[letter]!tr (Fortinet); HEUR:Backdoor.Linux.Gafgyt.[letter] (Kaspersky); DDoS:Linux/Gafgyt.YA!MTB (Microsoft); ELF_GAFGYT.[letter] (Trend Micro); As Lizkebab: Linux/Lizkebab.[letter] (ESET); As Torlus
- Aliases: Gafgyt, Lizkebab, Qbot, Torlus
- Type: Botnet
- Author: Unknown

Technical details
- Platform: Linux
- Written in: C

BASHLITE (also known as Gafgyt, Lizkebab, Qbot and Torlus) is malware which infects Linux systems in order to launch distributed denial-of-service attacks (DDoS). Originally it was also known under the name Bashdoor, but this term now refers to the exploit method used by the malware. It has been used to launch attacks of up to 400 Gbps.

The original version in 2014 exploited a flaw in the Bash shell - the Shellshock software bug - to exploit devices running BusyBox, with Bash installed as an additional shell. A few months later a variant was detected that could also infect other vulnerable devices in the local network. In 2015 its source code was leaked, causing a proliferation of different variants, and by 2016 it was reported that one million devices have been infected.

Of the identifiable devices participating in these botnets in August 2016 almost 96 percent were IoT devices (of which 95 percent were cameras and DVRs), roughly 4 percent were home routers - and less than 1 percent were compromised Linux servers.

== Design ==
BASHLITE is written in C, and designed to easily cross-compile to various computer architectures.

Exact capabilities differ between variants, but the most common features generate several different types of DDoS attacks: it can hold open TCP connections, send a random string of junk characters to a TCP or a UDP port, or repeatedly send TCP packets with specified flags. They may also have a mechanism to run arbitrary shell commands on the infected machine. There are no facilities for reflected or amplification attacks.

BASHLITE uses a client–server model for command and control. The protocol used for communication is essentially a lightweight version of Internet Relay Chat (IRC). Even though it supports multiple command and control servers, most variants only have a single command and control IP-address hardcoded.

It propagates via brute forcing, using a built-in dictionary of common usernames and passwords. The malware connects to random IP addresses and attempts to login, with successful logins reported back to the command and control server.

== See also ==
- Denial-of-service attack (DoS)
- Fork bomb
- Hajime (malware)
- LOIC
  - High Orbit Ion Cannon – the replacement for LOIC used in DDoS attacks
  - Low Orbit Ion Cannon – a stress test tool that has been used for DDoS attacks
- Mirai (malware)
- ReDoS
- Slowloris (computer security)
