= Hans Heinrich Hübner =

German hacker

- Born: July 24, 1968 (age 58); Berlin, West Germany
- Other name: Pengo
- Occupation: Hacker

Hans Heinrich Hübner (born July 24, 1968, in Berlin) is a German hacker, known by the handle Pengo. The name derives from the popular arcade game Pengo, released in the early 1980s.

== Life ==
In the 1980s, Hübner was involved in the KGB hacks alongside Markus Hess and Karl Koch. The events were later chronicled by Katie Hafner and John Markoff in their book Cyberpunk: Outlaws and Hackers on the Computer Frontier and by Clifford Stoll in his book The Cuckoo's Egg, adapted for television in 1990 as The KGB, the Computer and Me, and subsequently depicted in the German feature film 23 – Nothing Is What It Seems. In the film, Hübner is merged with Hess into a single composite character named David for dramatic purposes; accordingly, the film's portrayal does not accurately reflect the actual events.

In 2011, Hübner was the registered organizer of a demonstration held on February 26 in Berlin calling for the resignation of Minister Karl-Theodor zu Guttenberg in connection with the Guttenberg plagiarism affair.
