= Karl Koch (hacker) =

German hacker (1965-c. 1989)

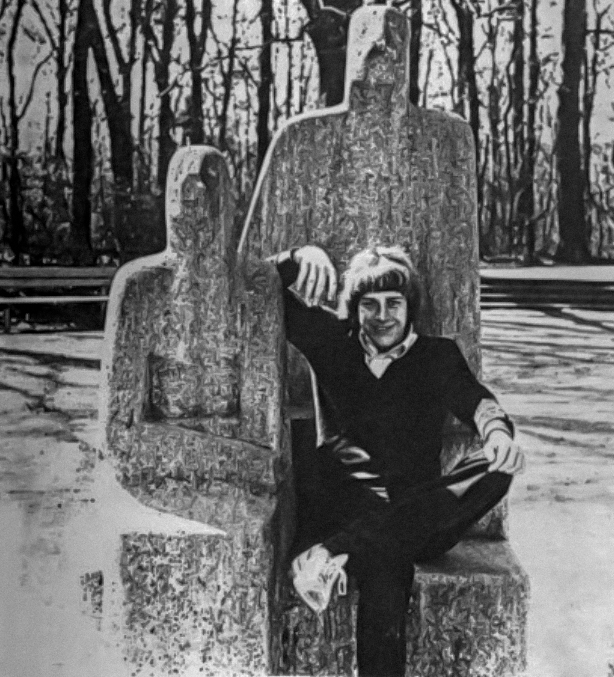
- Born: Karl Werner Lothar Koch; July 22, 1965; Hanover, West Germany
- Died: c. May 23, 1989 (aged 23); Celle, West Germany
- Occupation: hacker
- Known for: Cold War hacker

Karl Werner Lothar Koch (July 22, 1965 – c. May 23, 1989) was a German hacker in the 1980s, who called himself "hagbard", after Hagbard Celine. He was involved in a Cold War computer espionage incident.

== Biography ==
Koch was born in Hanover. His mother died of cancer in 1976; his father had alcohol problems and in August 1984 also died of cancer.

Koch was interested in astronomy as a teenager and was also involved in the state student's council. In 1979 Karl's father gave him the 1975 book, Illuminatus! – The Golden Apple by Robert Anton Wilson and Robert Shea, which had a strong influence to him. From his income as a member of the state students' council, he bought his first computer in 1982 and named it "FUCKUP" ("First Universal Cybernetic-Kinetic Ultra-Micro Programmer") after The Illuminatus! Trilogy. In 1985 Koch and some other hackers founded the Computer-Stammtisch in a pub of the Hanover-Oststadt, which developed later into the Chaos Computer Club Hanover. During this time Koch began to use hard drugs. In February 1987 Koch broke off a vacation in Spain, because of this, and had himself admitted to a psychiatric clinic in Aachen for rehab treatments, where he stayed for three months.

== Hacking ==
He worked with the hackers known as DOB (Dirk-Otto Brezinski), Pengo (Hans Heinrich Hübner), and Urmel (Markus Hess), and was involved in selling hacked information from United States military computers to the KGB. Clifford Stoll's book The Cuckoo's Egg gives a first-person account of the hunt and eventual identification and arrest of Hess in March 1989. Pengo and Koch subsequently came forward and confessed to the authorities under the espionage amnesty, which protected them from being prosecuted.

== Death ==
In May 1989 Koch left his workplace in his car to go for lunch; when he had not returned by late afternoon, his employer reported him as a missing person.

German police were alerted to a long abandoned car in a forest near Celle on June 1, 1989. The remains of Koch—at this point just bones—were discovered close by with a patch of scorched and burnt ground surrounding them and with his shoes missing. The scorched earth itself was controlled in a small circle around the corpse even though it had not rained in some time and the grass was perfectly dry.

Despite his death being officially ruled a suicide, his death fueled conspiracy theories, with speculation ranging from suicide due to psychological struggles and drug addiction to retaliation by intelligence agencies. His death remains controversial, symbolizing both the dangers of hacking and the psychological toll of his lifestyle. Koch's story inspired books, films, and enduring myths about hackers and conspiracies. No suicide note was ever found.

The date of Karl Koch's death is notable due to it occurring on the 23rd day of the 5th month of his 23rd year of life, a symbolic reference to Koch's interest in Discordianism where the numbers 5 and 23 hold special meaning.

== Karl Koch in media ==
=== Books ===
- Katie Hafner, John Markoff (November 1995). CYBERPUNK: Outlaws and Hackers on the Computer Frontier, Revised (November 1, 1995 ed.). Simon & Schuster. pp. 400. ISBN 0-684-81862-0.

=== Movies ===
A German movie about his life, entitled 23, was released in 1998. While the film was critically acclaimed, it has been harshly criticized as exploitative by real-life witnesses. A corrective to the film's take is the documentation written by his friends.

In 1990, a documentary was released titled The KGB, The Computer and Me.

=== Music ===
- Koch was memorialized by Clock DVA at the opening of their music video for "The Hacker" and in the liner notes for "The Hacker" on the album Buried Dreams (1989).

=== Television ===
- Norwegian docuseries Brennpunkt, as featured on West German broadcaster, ARD, dedicated the show "Eastern spies on Western computer networks. German hackers are working for the KGB" to sharing Koch's story as a West German hacker working for the KGB.
  - The episode aired in March of 1989, having been on the same day that West German police launched a nationwide investigation for 4 men, all wanted for cyberterrorism against the West German government as well as selling West German intelligence to the KGB. This event sparked many conspiracy theories among German and Soviet onlookers at the time, suspecting that Koch was among the 4 men arrested.

== See also ==
- Boris Floricic a.k.a. Tron, a computer hacker who allegedly suffered a similar fate
