= Freedom Downtime =

2001 documentary film by Emmanuel Goldstein

- Directed by: Emmanuel Goldstein
- Produced by: Emmanuel Goldstein
- Narrated by: Emmanuel Goldstein
- Cinematography: Brian Newman; Guy Gustafson; Michael Kaegler
- Edited by: Michael Kaegler
- Music by: Theta Wave State, others
- Distributed by: 2600 Magazine
- Release date: 2001
- Country: United States
- Language: English

Freedom Downtime is a 2001 American documentary film directed by Emmanuel Goldstein and produced by 2600 Films. The film examines the prosecution and imprisonment of Kevin Mitnick, the Free Kevin movement, and public perceptions of hacker culture.

== Synopsis ==
The documentary was produced in response to the 2000 feature film Takedown, which dramatized the pursuit and arrest of Kevin Mitnick. Through interviews with hackers, journalists, attorneys, family members, and technology enthusiasts, Freedom Downtime presents an alternative perspective on Mitnick's prosecution and on the broader hacker community.

The film follows a group of computer enthusiasts who travel across the United States criticizing aspects of Takedown and discussing what they viewed as inaccuracies in its portrayal of events. It also explores the treatment of computer-crime defendants within the criminal justice system and profiles several individuals associated with hacker culture.

Interview subjects include Phiber Optik (Mark Abene), Bernie S (Ed Cummings), Lewis De Payne, Alex Kasper, Kevin Mitnick, and Emmanuel Goldstein. The film also features footage from the DEF CON and Hackers on Planet Earth conferences.

The documentary includes interviews with the authors of Cyberpunk: Outlaws and Hackers on the Computer Frontier, Katie Hafner and John Markoff. The film contrasts their perspectives on Mitnick's case, while also featuring interviews with Mitnick's grandmother Reba Vartanian, attorneys, friends, and technology activists.

== Release ==
The film premiered at H2K, the 2000 Hackers on Planet Earth conference. It subsequently received a limited independent theatrical release and was screened at film festivals. One documented screening took place at Vancouver's Blinding Light Cinema in March 2003.

The film was initially distributed on VHS through the 2600 website.

A two-disc DVD edition was released in June 2004. The release included approximately three hours of additional footage, a January 2003 interview with Kevin Mitnick, multilingual subtitles created by volunteers, and several hidden features.

== Music ==
- Jimi Hendrix – "All Along the Watchtower"
- The Specials – "Bad Boys"
- The Rutles – "Easy Listening"
- The Electric Hellfire Club – "Hellflower"
- DJ Sy – "Helter Skelter"
- Klaatu – "Perpetual Motion Machine"
- Tupac Shakur – songs from R U Still Down? (Remember Me)
- Daniel Johnston – "Sad Sac and Tarzan"
- The Specials – "Time Has Come"
- Dead Kennedys – "Viva Las Vegas"

== See also ==
- Track Down – 2000 film by Joe Chappelle
- Kevin Mitnick – American hacker (1963–2023)
- Cyberpunk: Outlaws and Hackers on the Computer Frontier – 1991 nonfiction book by Katie Hafner and John Markoff
- The Secret History of Hacking – 2001 television documentary film by Ralph Lee
