= Susan Headley =

American computer hacker (born 1959)

- Born: Susan Headley; 1959 (age 66–67); Altona, Illinois, United States
- Other names: Susy Thunder, Susan Thunder
- Occupations: Former phreaker, hacker, social engineer
- Years active: 1977–1983 (hacking/phreaking)

Susan Headley (born 1959), also known as Susy Thunder or Susan Thunder, is an American former phreaker and early computer hacker who was active during the late 1970s and early 1980s. Headley specialized in a type of hacking that uses pretexting and misrepresentation of oneself in contact with targeted organizations to get information vital to hacking those organizations. She called this "psychological subversion"; it is also called social engineering.

== Biography ==
Born in Altona, Illinois, in 1959, Headley said she dropped out of school in the eighth grade after a difficult childhood. She later moved to Los Angeles, California, where she was a rock and roll band groupie and worked as a sex worker who claimed to be one of only three women to have slept with all four members of the Beatles in a "systematic conquest."

As a young person, she developed interest and expertise in telephone networks and circumventing systems. According to The Hacker's Handbook (1990), she hacked the United States phone system as a 17-year-old in 1977 and was "one of the earliest of the present generation of hackers". For a while in the late 1970s and early 1980s, she collaborated with computer hacker Kevin Mitnick (also known as Condor) and phone phreaker Lewis De Payne (also known as Rosco) on hacking into Pacific Bell systems and other systems, although there were conflicts between the group members. In 1981–1982, she testified against Mitnick and de Payne in a theft case related to Pacific Bell, and provided evidence against de Payne in a case related to hacking U.S Leasing, in exchange for immunity.

In 1982, Headley gave an interview on the television show 20/20 about circumventing security systems, including the technique of "garbology": dumpster diving to find system documentation and other useful information thrown away by telephone company staff. On October 25, 1983, Headley testified in front of the U.S. Senate Committee on Governmental Affairs about the technical capabilities and motivations of hackers and phone phreaks. On 20/20 and in her Senate testimony, she explained that motivations for the hackers she knew included curiosity, challenge, and intense competition with each other, rather than profit. In the 1980s, she worked as a security consultant and a professional poker player. In 1995, Headley presented a talk at DEF CON about "Social Engineering and Psychological Subversion of Trusted Systems", including about using seduction as part of strategies for social engineering.

In 1991, journalists Katie Hafner and John Markoff published a book, Cyberpunk: Outlaws and Hackers on the Computer Frontier, about Headley, Mitnick, de Payne, and other hackers. Later, she was noted as one of only a few women among early phone phreaks and one of the earliest known female hackers. Writer Claire L. Evans, who profiled Headley in The Verge in 2022, described her as "a mythological figure in hacking history". As of 2024, a film based on the profile was in development.

=== Public service ===
Headley was elected to public office in California in 1994, as City Clerk of California City.

=== Personal life ===
Headley is married and lives in the Midwest. She is a coin collector and coin expert.

== See also ==
- Cyberpunk: Outlaws and Hackers on the Computer Frontier – 1991 nonfiction book by Katie Hafner and John Markoff
