= The Secret History of Hacking =

2001 television documentary film by Ralph Lee

- Directed by: Ralph Lee
- Produced by: Mira King; September Films
- Starring: John Draper; Steve Wozniak; Kevin Mitnick
- Narrated by: Qarie Marshall
- Music by: Chris Marshall
- Release date: 2001
- Running time: 50 minutes
- Language: English

The Secret History of Hacking (also broadcast as Hackers: Computer Outlaws) is a 2001 television documentary film directed by Ralph Lee and produced by September Films for Channel 4 and TLC. The documentary examines the history of phreaking, computer hacking, and social engineering from the 1970s through the 1990s through interviews with prominent figures associated with the hacking and personal computing communities.

== Overview ==
The documentary traces the development of hacking culture from the era of telephone phreaking and blue boxes through the rise of personal computing and computer security hacking. Featured participants discuss the activities of early phone phreakers, the influence of the Homebrew Computer Club, and the growing public awareness of computer security issues during the late twentieth century.

The film includes extensive commentary from John Draper, Steve Wozniak, and Kevin Mitnick, and examines changing public and law-enforcement perceptions of hacking, including the influence of media coverage and popular depictions such as WarGames.

== Broadcast ==
The documentary was broadcast on Channel 4 in the United Kingdom in February 2001. Contemporary television listings described the programme as an examination of the history of hacking and featured interviews with notable figures from the hacking and computing communities.

In the United States, the documentary was broadcast under the title Hackers: Computer Outlaws.

== Participants ==
The documentary includes interviews with or archival appearances by:

- John Draper
- Steve Wozniak
- Kevin Mitnick
- Denny Teresi
- Joybubbles
- Mike Gorman
- Ron Rosenbaum
- Steven Levy
- Paul Loser
- Lee Felsenstein
- Jim Warren
- John Markoff
- Jay Foster
- Ken McGuire
- Jonathan Littman
- Michael Strickland

== See also ==
- Freedom Downtime – 2001 documentary film by Emmanuel Goldstein
- Cyberpunk: Outlaws and Hackers on the Computer Frontier – 1991 nonfiction book by Katie Hafner and John Markoff
- Track Down – 2000 film by Joe Chappelle
- List of films about computers
