= Cyberpunk: Outlaws and Hackers on the Computer Frontier =

1991 nonfiction book by Katie Hafner and John Markoff

- Author: Katie Hafner and John Markoff
- Language: English
- Subject: Hacker culture, computer security, phone phreaking
- Genre: Non-fiction
- Publisher: Simon & Schuster
- Publication date: 1991
- Publication place: United States
- ISBN: 978-0-671-68322-1
- OCLC: 715701555

Cyberpunk: Outlaws and Hackers on the Computer Frontier is a 1991 non-fiction book by journalists Katie Hafner and John Markoff. Published by Simon & Schuster, it presents three narrative accounts of prominent figures in the computer underground of the 1980s: Kevin Mitnick, German hacker Hans Heinrich Hübner ("Pengo"), and Robert Tappan Morris, creator of the Morris worm.

== Publication history ==
The book was first published by Simon & Schuster in 1991.

A revised edition containing a new epilogue was published by Simon & Schuster in 1995 (ISBN 978-0-684-81862-7).

== Contents ==
The book examines three principal figures associated with computer crime and hacking culture: Kevin Mitnick, Robert Tappan Morris, and German hacker Hans Heinrich Hübner ("Pengo").

=== Kevin Mitnick ===
The first section focuses on Kevin Mitnick and the Southern California hacking and phone phreaking community of the 1980s, including associates such as Lewis De Payne and Susan Headley. The narrative covers their activities, investigations, and arrests and draws on contemporary reporting about the community, including an early profile of De Payne (as "Rosco") published in L.A. Weekly in 1980.

=== Hans Heinrich Hübner ("Pengo") ===
The second section profiles Hans Heinrich Hübner, a West Berlin hacker involved in a hacking operation that sold information to the KGB. The events described are connected to the hacking network investigated by Clifford Stoll and later documented in The Cuckoo's Egg.

=== Robert Tappan Morris ===
The third section examines Robert Tappan Morris and the creation and impact of the Morris worm in 1988.

== Reception ==
Kirkus Reviews described the book as "three cautionary tales of 1980's computer hackers gone amok."

Publishers Weekly noted the authors' "straightforward style" and character portraits, calling the book "more-or-less able pieces of journalism."

In The New York Times, reviewer Walter Mosley described the work as "a collection of three long pieces" about young computer hackers and their relationship with emerging technology.

A review in the Burton Mail described the book as an account of the computer underground and its participants.

Writing in the North County Times, Jane Missett noted that Hafner and Markoff explained the methods and motivations of computer hackers without overwhelming readers with technical detail.

== See also ==
- Kevin Mitnick
- Lewis De Payne
- Susan Headley
- Robert Tappan Morris
- Morris worm
- The Cuckoo's Egg
- Takedown
- Chaos Computer Club
- The Art of Intrusion
- The Art of Deception
