= The Fugitive Game: Online with Kevin Mitnick =

1996 non-fiction book by Jonathan Littman

The Fugitive Game
- Author: Jonathan Littman
- Language: English
- Subject: Kevin Mitnick, computer hacking
- Genre: Non-fiction
- Publisher: Little, Brown and Company
- Publication date: 1996
- Publication place: United States
- Media type: Print (hardcover)
- Pages: 383
- ISBN: 978-0-316-52858-0

The Fugitive Game: Online with Kevin Mitnick is a 1996 non-fiction book by American journalist Jonathan Littman. The book chronicles the life of computer hacker Kevin Mitnick during the period when he was a fugitive from United States law enforcement authorities between 1992 and 1995. Drawing on more than fifty hours of telephone conversations with Mitnick while he was in hiding, the book presents Mitnick's account of the events that led to his pursuit and eventual arrest.

Littman initially set out to research a broader story on computer security but shifted focus after connecting with Mitnick. The book portrays Mitnick's use of social engineering, cloned cell phones, and other techniques, while contrasting sharply with media narratives of the time.

The book was published shortly after Mitnick's arrest in February 1995 and offered a perspective that differed substantially from contemporary accounts presented in the media and in Takedown: The Pursuit and Capture of Kevin Mitnick, America's Most Wanted Computer Outlaw by John Markoff and Tsutomu Shimomura.

== Background ==
Littman began researching the world of computer hackers and security experts around 1994. His work intersected with the high-profile pursuit of Mitnick, who had become a media sensation following front-page stories in The New York Times. Through phone interviews conducted while Mitnick was still on the run, Littman gained direct access to the fugitive's side of the story, including details of his double life, narrow escapes, assumed identities, and motivations.

== Synopsis ==
The book follows Mitnick's activities as a fugitive after violating the terms of his supervised release in 1992. It describes his use of cloned cellular telephones, social engineering techniques, and computer intrusions while evading capture by federal authorities. Through interviews and recorded conversations, Littman recounts Mitnick's interactions with fellow hackers, journalists, private investigators, and law enforcement agencies.

The narrative details how criminal hackers often operated more like con artists—relying on guile and impersonation over technical prowess at the keyboard. It culminates with Mitnick's arrest in Raleigh, North Carolina, in February 1995 following an investigation involving computer security researcher Tsutomu Shimomura and the Federal Bureau of Investigation.

== Reception ==
Contemporary newspaper reviews praised the book for providing a counter-narrative to the dominant media portrayal of Mitnick.

Reviewing the book for The Christian Science Monitor, computer security author Simson Garfinkel described The Fugitive Game as standing alone in the crowded field of cybercrime books. He called it the inside scoop, praising its intricate depiction of the cybercriminal on the run and its revelations about the computer world's subculture. Garfinkel highlighted Littman's portrayal of hackers as computer-age con men skilled in social engineering.

Other reviews highlighted the book's role in looking behind the hacker myth and offering an alternative view of the Mitnick saga.

The book attracted attention for challenging aspects of the narrative presented by Markoff and Shimomura regarding the pursuit and capture of Mitnick. Littman questioned aspects of the reporting surrounding the case and the role played by private individuals in the investigation.

== Legacy ==
The book became part of a broader public debate concerning the portrayal of computer hackers in the media and the prosecution of computer-crime cases during the 1990s. Its account of the Mitnick case has been cited as a counterpoint to the version of events presented in Takedown.

In 2000, Littman filed a lawsuit alleging that portions of the film Track Down (released internationally as Takedown) were derived from material contained in The Fugitive Game without authorization.

Littman's work, alongside Mitnick's own later memoir Ghost in the Wires, contributed to a more nuanced public understanding of Mitnick, who later became a security consultant. The book remains a referenced account in discussions of 1990s cybercrime history.

== See also ==
- Kevin Mitnick
- Tsutomu Shimomura
- Ghost in the Wires
- Social engineering (security)
