= United States v. Morris =

United States v. Morris may refer to:

- United States v. Morris (1840), 39 U.S. (14 Pet.) 464 (1840), interpreting the Slave Trade Act of 1800
- United States v. Morris (1991), 928 F.2d 504 (2d Cir. 1991), the first conviction under the Computer Fraud and Abuse Act
