= Tsutomu Shimomura =

Physicist and computer security expert (born 1964)

- Born: October 23, 1964 (age 62); Nagoya, Japan
- Education: California Institute of Technology
- Occupations: Computer programmer, physicist
- Known for: Catching Kevin Mitnick
- Father: Osamu Shimomura

Tsutomu Shimomura (下村 努, Shimomura Tsutomu; born October 23, 1964) is a Japanese-born physicist and computer security expert. He is known for helping the FBI track and arrest hacker Kevin Mitnick. Takedown, his 1996 book on the subject with journalist John Markoff, was later adapted for the screen in Track Down in 2000.

Shimomura was a founder of semiconductor company Neofocal Systems, and was CEO and CTO until 2016.

== Biography ==
Born in Japan, Shimomura is the son of Osamu Shimomura, winner of the 2008 Nobel Prize in Chemistry. He grew up in Princeton, New Jersey, and attended Princeton High School.

At Caltech he studied under Nobel laureate Richard Feynman. After Caltech, he went on to work at Los Alamos National Laboratory, where he continued his hands-on education in the position of staff physicist with Brosl Hasslacher and others on subjects such as lattice gas automata.

In 1989, he became a research scientist in computational physics at the University of California, San Diego, and senior fellow at the San Diego Supercomputer Center. Shimomura also became a noted computer security expert, working for the National Security Agency.

In 1992, he testified before Congress on issues regarding the privacy and security (or lack thereof) on cellular telephones. Author Bruce Sterling described his first meeting with Shimomura in the documentary Freedom Downtime:

It was in front of Congress, and I was testifying to a Congressional subcommittee. And here was this guy in sandals and, like, ragged-ass cutoffs, and the rest of us were done up in ties [...] giving our best sort of 'yes, we're in front of Congress' thing and Shimomura is there in this surfer gear.

He is best known for events in 1995, when he assisted with tracking down the computer hacker Kevin Mitnick. In that year Shimomura also received prank calls which popularized the phrase "My kung fu is stronger than yours", equating it with hacking. Shimomura and journalist John Markoff wrote a book, Takedown, about the pursuit, and the book was later adapted into a movie with a very similar name, Track Down. Shimomura, himself, appeared in a brief cameo in the movie.

Shimomura was a founder of privately held fabless semiconductor company Neofocal Systems, and was CEO and CTO until 2016.

== Criticism ==
Kevin Mitnick and others have raised legal and ethical questions concerning Shimomura's involvement in his case. California author Jonathan Littman wrote a 1996 book about the case called The Fugitive Game: Online with Kevin Mitnick, in which he presented Mitnick's side of the story, which was a very different version from the events written in Shimomura and Markoff's Takedown. In his book, Littman made allegations of journalistic impropriety against Markoff and questioned the legality of Shimomura's involvement in the matter, as well as suggesting that many parts of Takedown were fabricated by its authors for self-serving purposes. Mitnick's autobiography, Ghost in the Wires, further expands on concerns that Shimomura's involvement in the case was both unethical and illegal.

== Writing credits ==
- Takedown: The Pursuit and Capture of Kevin Mitnick, America's Most Wanted Computer Outlaw—By the Man Who Did It (with John Markoff), 1996, Hyperion Books. ISBN 0-7868-6210-6
  - French title: Cybertraque, 1998, ISBN 2-259-18402-2
  - Dutch title: De klopjacht, 1996, ISBN 90-254-0639-4
  - German Title: Data Zone - Die Hackerjagd im Internet, 1996, ISBN 3-423-15101-3
  - Spanish Title: Takedown. Persecución y captura de Kevin Mitnick, el forajido informático más buscado de Norteamérica. Una crónica escrita por el hombre que lo capturó., 1997, ISBN 8403595980
- "Minimal Key Lengths for Symmetric Ciphers to Provide Adequate Commercial Security", January 1996 (co-authors: Shimomura, Bruce Schneier, Ronald L. Rivest, Matt Blaze, Whitfield Diffie, Eric Thompson, Michael Wiener) (pdf)
