= Lewis Payne =

Lewis Payne may refer to:

- Lewis Powell (conspirator) (1844–1865), also known as Lewis Payne, American Confederate soldier who attempted to assassinate William H. Seward.
- Lewis F. Payne Jr. (born 1945), American politician from Virginia
- Lewis S. Payne (1819–1898), American merchant, Union Army officer, and politician from New York
- Lewis Payne (footballer) (born 2004), English association footballer
- Lewis De Payne American phone phreaker and hacker

== See also ==
- Louis Payne (1873–1954), American silent film actor
