= Pengo =

Pengo may refer to:

- Pengo (video game), a 1982 video arcade game
- Hungarian pengő, an old Hungarian currency
- Pengo language, a Dravidian language spoken in south central India
- Babungo language, an African language also known as Pengo
- Polycarp Pengo (1944–2026), Tanzanian Roman Catholic archbishop and cardinal
- Hans Heinrich Hübner (born 1968), a German hacker, known as Pengo
