= Cuckoo's egg (metaphor) =

Metaphor for brood parasitism

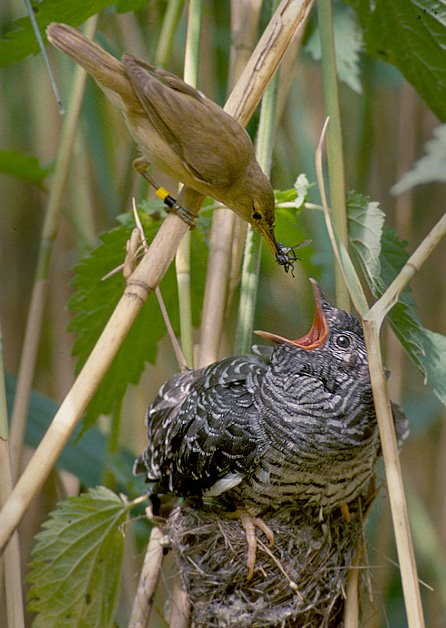
A reed warbler raising a common cuckoo chick it hatched from an egg surreptitiously placed in its nest by the cuckoo's parent

The term cuckoo's egg is a metaphor for brood parasitism, where a parasitic bird deposits its egg into a host's nest, which then incubates and feeds the chick that hatches, even at the expense of its own offspring. That original biological meaning has been extended to other uses, including one which references spyware and various pieces of malware.

== History ==
The concept has been in use in the study of brood parasitism in birds since the 19th century. It first evolved a metaphoric meaning of "misplaced trust", wherein the chick hatched of a cuckoo's egg, having been surreptitiously laid among the eggs of another bird of a different, smaller species, and thereupon incubated by the unwitting host parents, will consume any food brought by them to feed their own chicks, which then starve and eventually die.

The first well known application to tradecraft was in the 1989 book The Cuckoo's Egg: Tracking a Spy Through the Maze of Computer Espionage by Clifford Stoll, in which Stoll deployed a honeypot to catch a cyber hacker that had accessed the secure computer system of the classified U.S. government Lawrence Berkeley National Laboratory.

Stoll chronicles the so-called 'Cuckoo's Egg Investigation', "a term coined by American press to describe (at the time) the furthest reaching computer-mediated espionage penetration by foreign agents”, which was also known as Operation Equalizer initiated and executed by the KGB through a small cadre of German hackers.

In his book, Stoll describes the hacker employing a Trojan horse strategy to penetrate the secure Livermore Laboratory computer system:

I watched the cuckoo lay its egg: once again, he manipulated the files in my computer to make himself super-user. His same old trick: use the Gnu-Emacs move-mail to substitute his tainted program for the system's atrun file. Five minutes later, shazam! He was system manager.

== See also ==
- Brown-headed cowbird - another brood parasite that lays "cuckoo's eggs"
