= Movemail =

movemail is a computer program by the GNU Project that moves mail from a user's Unix mailspool to another file. It is part of GNU Mailutils.

A compromising of movemail was the backbone of the hack described in The Cuckoo's Egg by which Markus Hess broke into the Lawrence Berkeley National Laboratory computer system in 1986. The flaw in movemail, which has long since been repaired, is that the program was revised in 1986 to allow superuser access into the host computer in order to move POP email. The movemail bug has been highlighted as one of the Unix operating system family's most egregious failures of security.

== See also ==
- Mozilla Thunderbird
