= Lenny DiCicco =

American hacker associated with Kevin Mitnick

- Born: Leonard DiCicco
- Other name: Lenny DiCicco
- Known for: Association with Kevin Mitnick and early computer hacking cases

Leonard "Lenny" DiCicco is an American former computer hacker known for his association with Kevin Mitnick and for his involvement in computer intrusion cases during the 1980s. He received media attention for his role in the investigation that led to Mitnick's 1988 arrest and for subsequent federal computer crime proceedings.

== Association with Kevin Mitnick ==
DiCicco was a longtime friend and associate of hacker Kevin Mitnick. According to contemporary reporting in the Los Angeles Times, DiCicco cooperated with federal authorities during the investigation that led to Mitnick's arrest in December 1988.

Federal prosecutors alleged that Mitnick had used computer access available through DiCicco's workplace to obtain proprietary software from Digital Equipment Corporation.

== Legal proceedings ==
In 1989, DiCicco pleaded guilty in federal court to charges arising from the Digital Equipment Corporation intrusion case. He was sentenced to probation and community service.
