= Silicon Snake Oil =

1995 book by Clifford Stoll

Silicon Snake Oil: Second Thoughts on the Information Highway
- Author: Clifford Stoll
- Language: English
- Publisher: Doubleday
- Publication date: 1995
- Publication place: United States
- Media type: Print
- Pages: 248
- ISBN: 0-385-41993-7
- Dewey Decimal: 303.48/33
- LC Class: QA76.9.C66 S88 1995
- Preceded by: The Cuckoo's Egg
- Followed by: High-Tech Heretic

Silicon Snake Oil: Second Thoughts on the Information Highway is a 1995 book written by Clifford Stoll where he discusses his ambivalence regarding the future of how the internet will be used. He wrote the book at a time when he felt the promise of the internet was being over-hyped: "I'm mainly speaking to people who feel mystically lured to the Internet: lotus-eaters, beware. Life in the real world is far more interesting, far more important, far richer, than anything you'll ever find on a computer screen." Stoll later acknowledged mistakes in the book.

== Summary ==
In Silicon Snake Oil and an accompanying article, "The Internet? Bah!", in Newsweek Stoll raised questions about the influence of the Internet on future society and whether it would be beneficial. Along the way, he made various predictions, e.g. about e-commerce (calling it nonviable due to a lack of personal contact and secure online funds transfers), the future of printed news publications ("no online database will replace your daily newspaper") and the cost of digitizing books would be too expensive since only 200 books had been digitized at the time. When the article resurfaced on BoingBoing in 2010, Stoll left a self-deprecating comment: "Of my many mistakes, flubs, and howlers, few have been as public as my 1995 howler....Now, whenever I think I know what's happening, I temper my thoughts: Might be wrong, Cliff..."

== See also ==
- Paul Krugman#Views on technology
