= Kevin Mitnick =

American hacker (1963–2023)

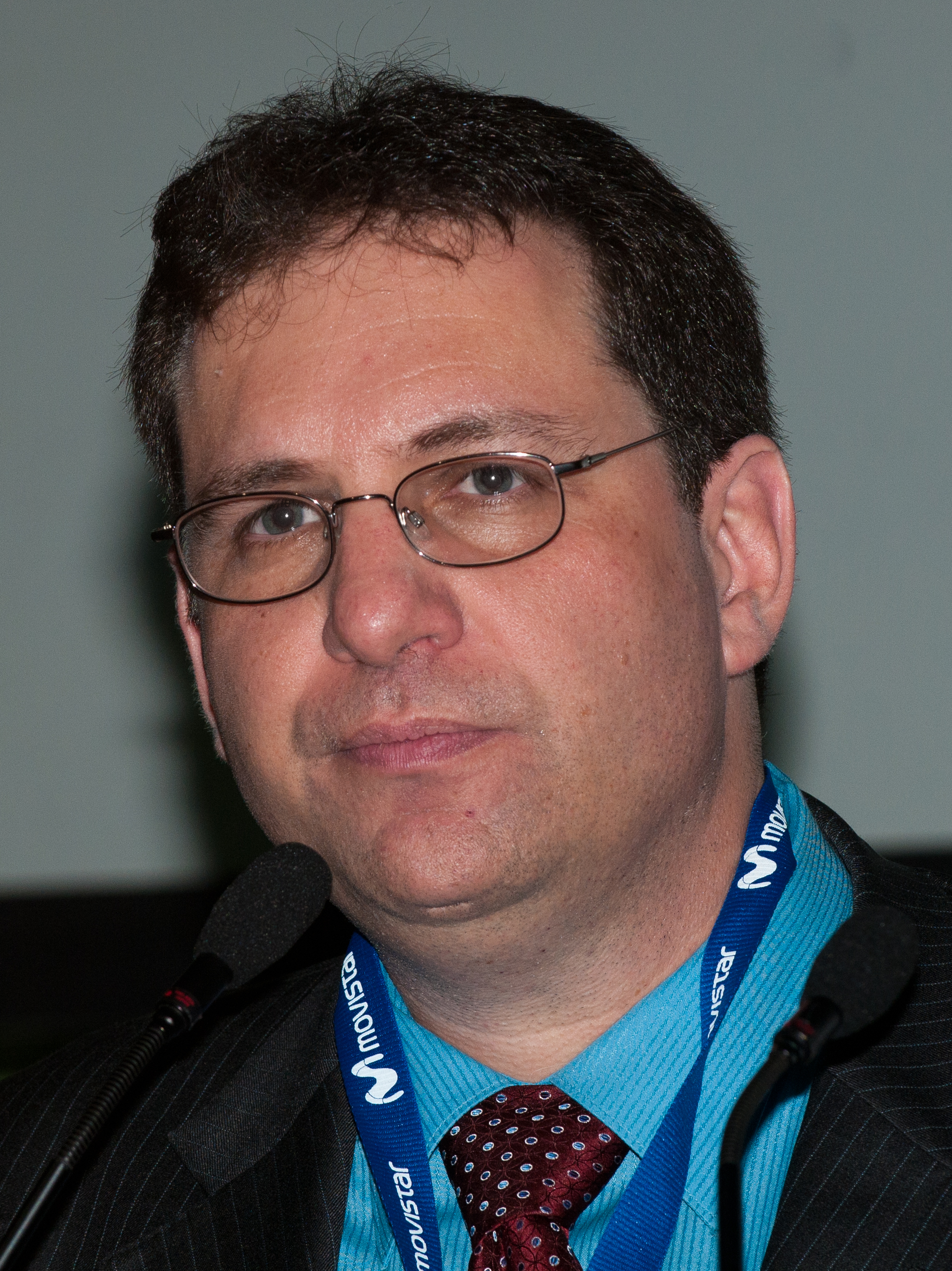
- Mitnick in 2010
- Born: Kevin David Mitnick; August 6, 1963; Los Angeles, California, U.S.
- Died: July 16, 2023 (aged 59); Pittsburgh, Pennsylvania, U.S.
- Other names: The Condor, The Darkside Hacker
- Occupations: Information technology consultant; Author
- Organizations: Mitnick Security Consulting; Chief Hacking Officer at KnowBe4, Inc
- Board member of: KnowBe4
- Criminal charges: 1995: Wire fraud (14 counts), possession of unauthorized access devices (8 counts), interception of wire or electronic communications, unauthorized access to a federal computer, and causing damage to a computer
- Criminal penalty: 1988: One year prison; 1999: 46 months prison plus 3 years probation
- Spouses: Bonnie Vitello (m. 1987; div. 1990) Kimberley Mitnick (m. 2022)
- Call sign: N6NHG
- Website: www.mitnicksecurity.com

Kevin David Mitnick (August 6, 1963 – July 16, 2023) was an American computer security consultant, author, and convicted hacker. In 1995, he was arrested for various computer and communications-related crimes, and spent five years in prison after being convicted of fraud and illegally intercepting communications. Mitnick's pursuit, arrest, trial and sentence were all controversial, as were the associated media coverage, books, and films, with his supporters arguing that his punishment was excessive and that many of the charges against him were fraudulent, and not based on actual losses. After his release from prison, he ran his own security firm, Mitnick Security Consulting, LLC, and was also involved with other computer security businesses.

== Early life and education ==
Mitnick was born on August 6, 1963, in Van Nuys, Los Angeles, California. His father was Alan Mitnick, his mother was Shelly Jaffe, and his maternal grandmother was Reba Vartanian. Mitnick was Jewish, and grew up in Los Angeles, California. At age 12, Mitnick convinced a bus driver to tell him where he could buy his own ticket punch for "a school project", and was then able to ride any bus in the greater Los Angeles area using unused transfer slips he found in a dumpster next to the bus company garage.

Mitnick attended James Monroe High School in North Hills, during which time he became a licensed amateur radio operator with callsign WA6VPS (his license was restored after imprisonment with callsign N6NHG). He chose the nickname "Condor" after watching the movie Three Days of the Condor. He was later enrolled at Los Angeles Pierce College and USC.

== Career ==
For a time, Mitnick worked as a receptionist for Stephen S. Wise Temple in Los Angeles.

=== Computer hacking ===
Mitnick gained unauthorized access to a computer network in 1979, at 16, when a friend gave him the telephone number for the Ark, the computer system that Digital Equipment Corporation (DEC) used for developing its RSTS/E operating system software. He broke into DEC's computer network and copied the company's software, a crime for which he was charged and convicted in 1988. He was sentenced to 12 months in prison followed by three years of supervised release. Near the end of his supervised release, Mitnick hacked into Pacific Bell voicemail computers. After a warrant was issued for his arrest, Mitnick fled, becoming a fugitive for two-and-a-half years.

According to the United States Department of Justice, Mitnick gained unauthorized access to dozens of computer networks while he was a fugitive. He used cloned cellular phones to hide his location and, among other things, copied valuable proprietary software from some of the country's largest cellular telephone and computer companies. Mitnick also intercepted and stole computer passwords, altered computer networks, and broke into and read private emails.

==== Arrest, conviction, and incarceration ====
Supporters from 2600 Magazine distributed "Free Kevin" bumper stickers.

After a well-publicized pursuit, the Federal Bureau of Investigation arrested Mitnick on February 15, 1995, at his apartment in Raleigh, North Carolina on federal offenses related to a two-and-a-half-year period of computer hacking that included computer and wire fraud. He was found with cloned cell phones, more than 100 cloned cellular phone codes, and multiple pieces of false identification.

In 1998, Mitnick was charged in the United States District Court for the Central District of California with 14 counts of wire fraud, eight counts of possession of unauthorized access devices, interception of wire or electronic communications, unauthorized access to a federal computer, and causing damage to a computer. As part of a plea bargain, Mitnick pleaded guilty in 1999 to four counts of wire fraud, two counts of computer fraud, and one count of illegally intercepting a wire communication. U.S. district judge Mariana Pfaelzer sentenced Mitnick to 46 months in federal prison plus 22 months for violating the terms of his 1989 supervised release sentence for computer fraud. He admitted to violating the terms of supervised release by hacking into Pacific Bell voicemail and other systems and to associating with known computer hackers, in this case co-defendant Lewis DePayne. He was diagnosed with Asperger syndrome, but it was not used as evidence because he pleaded guilty before going to trial.

Mitnick served five years in prison—four-and-a-half years' pre-trial and eight months in solitary confinement, because, according to Mitnick, law enforcement officials convinced a judge that he had the ability to "start a nuclear war by whistling into a pay phone", implying that law enforcement told the judge that he could somehow dial into the NORAD modem via a payphone from prison and communicate with the modem by whistling to launch nuclear missiles. In addition, a number of media outlets reported on the unavailability of kosher meals at the prison where he was incarcerated.

Mitnick was released from prison on January 21, 2000. During his supervised release period, which ended on January 21, 2003, he was initially forbidden to use any communications technology other than a landline telephone. Under the plea deal, Mitnick was also prohibited from profiting from films or books based on his criminal activity for seven years, under a variation of the Son of Sam law.

In December 2001, a Federal Communications Commission (FCC) judge ruled that Mitnick was sufficiently rehabilitated to possess a federally issued amateur radio license.

==== Controversy ====
Mitnick's criminal activities, arrest, and trial, along with the associated journalism, were all controversial. Though Mitnick was convicted of copying software unlawfully, his supporters argue that his punishment was excessive and that many of the charges against him were fraudulent and not based on actual losses.

John Markoff and Tsutomu Shimomura, who had both been part of the pursuit of Mitnick, wrote the book Takedown about Mitnick's capture.

The case against Mitnick tested the new laws that had been enacted for dealing with computer crime and it raised public awareness of security involving networked computers. The controversy remains and the Mitnick story is often cited today as an example of the influence of news media on law enforcement personnel.

=== Consulting ===
After his release in 2000, Mitnick became a security consultant, public speaker, and author.

In 2002, Mitnick co-founded Defensive Thinking Inc with Alex Kasperavičius. Together they developed the Certified Social Engineering Prevention Specialist (CSEPS) program, a multi-module corporate security-awareness training course and professional certification focused on defending against social engineering attacks. The curriculum covered topics such as pretexting, elicitation, psychological manipulation, dumpster diving, and organizational vulnerabilities. It was offered as a two-day boot camp costing approximately US$1,500 per attendee and included clients such as branches of the United States Air Force and United States Marine Corps.

Mitnick carried out security consulting, penetration testing services, and social engineering training for companies and government agencies.

In 2003, Mitnick testified before the United States House Committee on Financial Services regarding computer security and identity theft.

He ran Mitnick Security Consulting LLC, a computer security consultancy, and was part owner and Chief Hacking Officer at KnowBe4, the provider of an integrated platform for security awareness training and simulated phishing testing. Elements of the original CSEPS material were incorporated into KnowBe4's training offerings. He also served on the advisory board of Zimperium, a mobile security company specializing in mobile intrusion prevention systems.

He resided in Las Vegas, Nevada.

== Death ==
Mitnick died from pancreatic cancer on July 16, 2023, at the age of 59 at a Pittsburgh, Pennsylvania hospital. At the time of his death, he was married and his wife, Kimberley Mitnick (age 36), was pregnant with their first child, a son. Kimberley remains active in the cybersecurity and hacking communities.

== Media ==
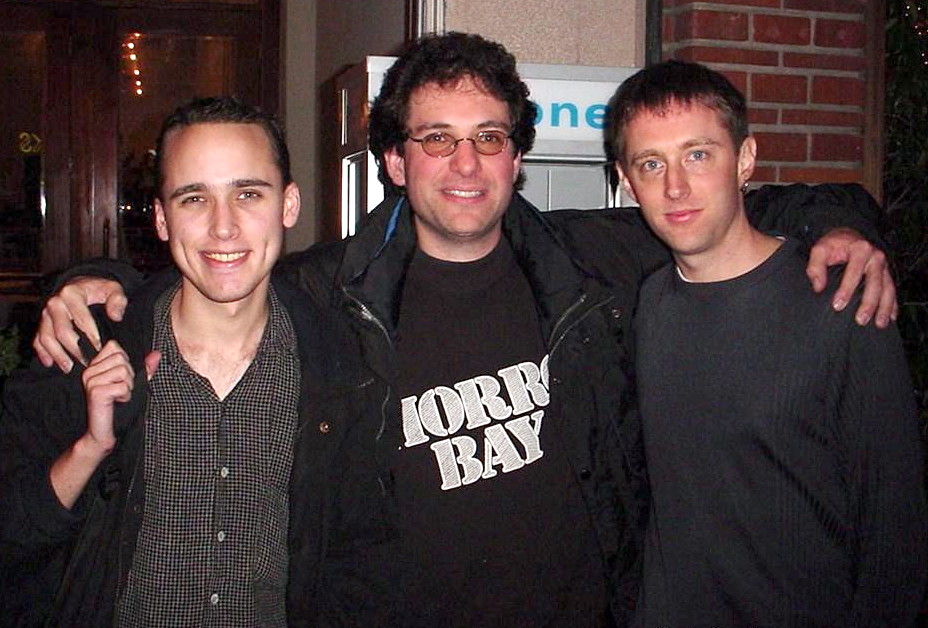
Hacker Adrian Lamo (arrested 2003), Kevin Mitnick, and reformed hacker Kevin Poulsen (released from prison 1996) (photo c. 2001)

In 2000, Skeet Ulrich and Russell Wong portrayed Mitnick and Tsutomu Shimomura, respectively, in the movie Track Down (known as Takedown outside the US), which was based on the book Takedown by John Markoff and Shimomura. The DVD was released in September 2004. From 2000 to 2002, Mitnick co-hosted DarkSide of the Internet, a two-hour weekly radio program on KFI in Los Angeles. Mitnick also appeared in Werner Herzog's documentary Lo and Behold, Reveries of the Connected World (2016).

== Bibliography ==
=== Books ===
==== About Mitnick ====
Several books were written about Mitnick's hacking activities, prosecution, and later public career:

- (1991) Cyberpunk: Outlaws and Hackers on the Computer Frontier, by Katie Hafner and John Markoff, ISBN 1-872180-94-9
- (1996) The Cyberthief and the Samurai: The True Story of Kevin Mitnick-And the Man Who Hunted Him Down, by Jeff Goodell, ISBN 978-0-440-22205-7
- (1996) Takedown: The Pursuit and Capture of Kevin Mitnick, America's Most Wanted Computer Outlaw—By the Man Who Did It, by Tsutomu Shimomura and John Markoff, ISBN 0-7868-8913-6
- (1996) The Fugitive Game: Online with Kevin Mitnick, by Jonathan Littman, ISBN 0-316-52858-7

==== Written by Mitnick ====
Mitnick was the co-author, with William L. Simon and Robert Vamosi, of four books, three on computer security and one autobiography:

- (2002) The Art of Deception: Controlling the Human Element of Security, ISBN 978-0-7645-4280-0
- (2005) The Art of Intrusion: The Real Stories Behind the Exploits of Hackers, Intruders & Deceivers, ISBN 978-0-7645-6959-3
- (2011) Ghost in the Wires: My Adventures as the World's Most Wanted Hacker, ISBN 978-0-316-03770-9
- (2017) The Art of Invisibility, ISBN 978-0-3163-8049-2

=== Articles ===
- Johnson, John (January 8, 1989). "Computer an 'Umbilical Cord to His Soul': 'Dark Side' Hacker Seen as 'Electronic Terrorist'". Los Angeles Times.
- Markoff, John (July 4, 1994). "Cyberspace's Most Wanted: Hacker Eludes F.B.I. Pursuit". The New York Times.
- Hafner, Katie (August 1995). "Kevin Mitnick, Unplugged". Esquire. Vol. 124, no. 2. pp. 80–88. Archived from the original on February 14, 2026.
- Christensen, John (March 18, 1999). "The trials of Kevin Mitnick". CNN. (Includes criminal record timeline).
- Fost, Dan (May 4, 2000). "Movie About Notorious Hacker Inspires a Tangle of Suits and Subplots". San Francisco Chronicle. Archived from the original on May 25, 2011.
- Harris, Roger (January 19, 2003). "After five years in jail, ex-computer hacker Mitnick changes sides". Ventura County Star.
- "Ex-Hacker Kevin Mitnick Teaches From Experience". The Wall Street Journal. October 15, 2003. Archived from the original on June 9, 2026. Alt URL
- Gray, Patrick (June 6, 2005). "A Tale of Two Hackers". Wired. Archived from the original on June 8, 2005.
- Littman, Jonathan (June 2007). "The Invisible Digital Man". Playboy. Archived (PDF) from the original on March 4, 2016.
- Ehrlich, Thomas (August 15, 2014). "Renowned security expert Kevin Mitnick can steal your identity in 3 minutes". Forbes. Archived from the original on July 22, 2015.
- Greenberg, Andy (September 24, 2014). "Kevin Mitnick, Once the World's Most Wanted Hacker, Is Now Selling Zero-Day Exploits". Wired.
- Hesseldahl, Arik (March 26, 2015). "Why Kevin Mitnick, the World's Most Notorious Hacker, Is Still Breaking Into Computers". Vox.com. Archived from the original on August 26, 2019.
- Albeck-Ripka, Livia; Mayorquin, Orlando (July 20, 2023). "Kevin Mitnick, Hacker Who Once Eluded Authorities, Is Dead at 59". The New York Times.
- Cho, Kelly Kasulis (July 20, 2023). "Kevin Mitnick, hacker and fugitive turned security consultant, dies at 59". The Washington Post.
- Rose, Andy (July 21, 2023). "Legendary computer hacker Kevin Mitnick dies at 59". CNN.

=== Government documents ===
- "FBI investigative files concerning Kevin Mitnick (1981–1990s)". FBI Records: The Vault. Federal Bureau of Investigation. Archived from the original on April 10, 2026.
- "United States v. Mitnick, 2:96-cr-00506". CourtListener.
- "Fugitive Computer Hacker Arrested in North Carolina" (Press release). United States Department of Justice. February 15, 1995. Archived from the original on June 13, 2013.
- "Kevin Mitnick Sentenced to Nearly Four Years in Prison; Computer Hacker Ordered to Pay Restitution to Victim Companies Whose Systems Were Compromised" (Press release). United States Attorney's Office, Central District of California. August 9, 1999. Archived from the original on June 13, 2013.
- "Testimony of Kevin Mitnick before the Senate Committee on Governmental Affairs" (PDF). United States Senate. March 2, 2000.
- "Hearing Designation Order (FCC 01-359)" (PDF). Federal Communications Commission. December 21, 2001. Archived (PDF) from the original on August 3, 2015.
- "Initial Decision of Chief Administrative Law Judge Richard L. Sippel (FCC 02D-02)" (PDF). Federal Communications Commission. December 23, 2002.
- "Kevin Mitnick Testimony Before the House Financial Services Committee" (PDF). United States House Committee on Financial Services. April 3, 2003.

=== Film, television and radio ===
- DarkSide of the Internet (2000–2002), a two-hour weekly radio program on KFI in Los Angeles DarkSide of the Internet at IMDb
- Freedom Downtime (2001) Freedom Downtime at IMDb
- "Doppelgänger", an episode of Alias (2001) – cameo as CIA Agent Burnett Doppelgänger at IMDb
- Track Down (2000; released in the United States in 2004 as Takedown) Track Down at IMDb
- The Secret History of Hacking (2001) The Secret History of Hacking at IMDb
- The Inside Man – cameo as himself The Inside Man at IMDb
- Lo and Behold, Reveries of the Connected World (2016) Lo and Behold, Reveries of the Connected World at IMDb

== See also ==
- Freedom Downtime – 2001 documentary film by Emmanuel Goldstein
- The Secret History of Hacking – 2001 television documentary film by Ralph Lee
- Lewis DePayne – American phone phreaker and hacker
- Lenny DiCicco – American hacker associated with Kevin Mitnick
- Kevin Poulsen – American computer hacker (born 1965)
- My kung fu is stronger than yours#Zeke Shif – a hack by Mitnick
- List of cybercriminals
