= 23 (film) =

1998 German drama thriller film by Hans-Christian Schmid

- Theatrical release poster
- Directed by: Hans-Christian Schmid
- Written by: Hans-Christian Schmid; Michael Gutmann; Michael Dierking
- Produced by: Jakob Claussen; Thomas Wöbke
- Starring: August Diehl; Fabian Busch; Dieter Landuris; Jan-Gregor Kremp
- Cinematography: Klaus Eichhammer
- Edited by: Hansjörg Weißbrich
- Music by: Norbert Jürgen Schneider
- Production company: Claussen + Wöbke Filmproduktion
- Distributed by: Buena Vista International
- Release dates: 2 July 1998 (Filmfest München); 14 January 1999 (Germany)
- Running time: 99 minutes
- Country: Germany
- Languages: German; English; Russian

23, original German title: 23 – Nichts ist so wie es scheint ("Nothing is what it seems") is a 1998 German drama thriller film about young hacker Karl Koch, who died on 23 May 1989, a presumed suicide. It was directed by Hans-Christian Schmid, who also participated in screenwriting. The title derives from the protagonist's obsession with the number 23, a phenomenon often described as apophenia. Although the film was well received by critics and audiences, its accuracy has been vocally disputed by several witnesses to the real-life events on which it was based. Schmid subsequently co-authored a book that tells the story of the making of 23 and also details the differences between the movie and the actual main events.

== Plot ==
In 1980s Germany at the height of the Cold War, 19-year-old Karl Koch finds the world around him threatening and chaotic. Inspired by the fictitious character Hagbard Celine (from Robert Anton Wilson and Robert Shea's 1975 book The Illuminatus! Trilogy), he starts investigating the backgrounds of political and economic power and discovers signs that make him believe in a worldwide conspiracy.

At a meeting of the Chaos Computer Club, Karl gets to know the student David. David and Karl are able to hack into the global data network — still in its early stages — and their belief in social justice propels them into espionage for the KGB. Driven by contacts with a drug dealer—and by increasing KGB pressure to hack into foreign systems—Karl spirals into a cocaine dependency and grows increasingly alienated from David.

In a drug-addled state, Karl begins to sit in front of his computer for days at a time. Perpetually sleepless, he also grows increasingly delusional. When David publicly reveals the espionage activity in which the two men have been engaged, Karl is left alone to face the consequences. Collapse soon follows. Karl is taken to a hospital to deal with his drug addiction and mysteriously dies after his supposed hacking of Chernobyl.

== Cast ==
- August Diehl as Karl Koch
- Fabian Busch as David
- Dieter Landuris as Pepe
- Jan-Gregor Kremp as Lupo
- Stephan Kampwirth as Jochen Maiwald
- Zbigniew Zamachowski as Sergej
- Peter Fitz as Brückner
- Burghart Klaußner as Weber
- Lilly Tschörtner as Beate
- Patrick Joswig as Alex
- Arnulf Schumacher as Seybert

== Awards ==
- 1999: German Film Award

== See also ==
- 23 enigma
- The Number 23
- The Cuckoo's Egg — a book by Clifford Stoll, another account of the Hanover Hacker case, written by one of the system administrators who discovered the break-ins.
- List of films featuring surveillance
