= The Art of Intrusion =

- Author: Kevin D. Mitnick; William L. Simon
- Language: English
- Genre: Computer security, computer hackers
- Publisher: John Wiley & Sons
- Publication date: March 4, 2005
- Pages: 270
- ISBN: 0-7645-6959-7
- OCLC: 224374215
- Dewey Decimal: 005.8 22
- LC Class: QA76.9.A25 M587 2005
- Preceded by: The Art of Deception

The Art of Intrusion: The Real Stories Behind the Exploits of Hackers, Intruders & Deceivers is a book by Kevin Mitnick that is a collection of stories about social engineering as performed by other hackers. Each story ends by summarizing insight into the attack as well as measures to defend against it. The book was published after Mitnick's first book, The Art of Deception, and explores the same themes introduced in the first book.
