= Jonathan Littman (author) =

American technology journalist and author

- Born: 1958 (age 67–68)
- Occupations: Author, journalist
- Writing career
- Notable works: The Fugitive Game; The Watchman; The Art of Innovation; The Ten Faces of Innovation

Jonathan Littman is an American technology journalist, author, and speaker. He is best known for his books on computer hackers, including The Fugitive Game: Online with Kevin Mitnick (1996), as well as co-authored works on corporate innovation and entrepreneurship with Tom Kelley of the design firm IDEO.

== Career ==
Littman began his career as a technology journalist in the San Francisco Bay Area during the 1980s, initially writing user manuals for software companies before contributing to early publications covering the emerging personal computer industry. He wrote for PC World and was hired as the first news editor at MacWeek, a trade journal focused on Apple. He later became a contributing editor for Playboy and a contributing writer for Red Herring magazine.

In 1987, Littman published his first major narrative non-fiction book, Once Upon a Time in ComputerLand, which detailed the massive legal battle over the early computer retail giant.

In 1996, he published The Fugitive Game: Online with Kevin Mitnick, which was built around dozens of hours of telephone interviews conducted with hacker Kevin Mitnick while Mitnick was a fugitive from federal law enforcement. He followed this in 1997 with The Watchman, a deep-dive account detailing the life and activities of serial hacker Kevin Poulsen.

Littman later co-authored several books focused on innovation, workplace dynamics, and corporate creativity. His most notable partnership was with Tom Kelley of the design firm IDEO, resulting in the bestsellers The Art of Innovation (2001) and The Ten Faces of Innovation (2005). He has also co-authored books exploring corporate work culture and entrepreneurial archetypes alongside Marc Hershon and Susanna Camp.

== Bibliography ==
- Littman, Jonathan (1987). Once Upon a Time in ComputerLand: The Amazing, Billion-Dollar Tale of Bill Millard. Price Stern Sloan. ISBN 9780895865021.
- Littman, Jonathan (1996). The Fugitive Game: Online with Kevin Mitnick. Little, Brown and Company. ISBN 9780316528580.
- Littman, Jonathan (1997). The Watchman: The Twisted Life and Crimes of Serial Hacker Kevin Poulsen. Little, Brown and Company. ISBN 9780316528573.
- Kelley, Tom; Littman, Jonathan (2001). The Art of Innovation: Lessons in Creativity from IDEO, America's Leading Design Firm. Currency/Doubleday. ISBN 9780385499842.
- Sandys, Celia; Littman, Jonathan (2004). We Shall Not Fail: The Inspiring Leadership of Winston Churchill. Portfolio. ISBN 9781591840442.
- Kelley, Tom; Littman, Jonathan (2005). The Ten Faces of Innovation: IDEO's Strategies for Beating the Devil's Advocate and Driving Creativity Throughout Your Organization. Currency/Doubleday. ISBN 9780385512077.
- Hershon, Marc; Littman, Jonathan (2009). I Hate People!: Kick Loose from the Overbearing and Underhanded Jerks at Work and Get What You Want Out of Your Job. Little, Brown and Company. ISBN 9780316053389.
- Littman, Jonathan (2010). Crashing Augusta: Real Life Tales of Sports, Men, and Murder. Snowball Narrative. ISBN 9781453693445.
- Littman, Jonathan (2013). The Beautiful Game: Sixteen Girls and the Soccer Season That Changed Everything. HarperCollins. ISBN 9780613309868.
- Camp, Susanna; Littman, Jonathan (2020). The Entrepreneur's Faces: How Makers, Visionaries and Outsiders Succeed. Snowball Narrative. ISBN 9781734723328.
