= Lewis De Payne =

American phone phreaker and hacker

- Other names: Lewis DePayne; Rosco
- Citizenship: American
- Occupations: Phone phreaker, computer hacker
- Years active: Late 1970s–1980s
- Known for: Early associate of Kevin Mitnick; involvement in the Southern California phone-phreaking community; operating the HOBO-UFO conference line

Lewis De Payne (also known as Lewis DePayne and by the hacker alias Rosco) is an American former phone phreaker and computer hacker associated with the Southern California hacking community of the late 1970s and 1980s. He is best known as an early associate of Kevin Mitnick and as a prominent figure in the Los Angeles phone-phreaking scene.

== Hacking activities ==
De Payne became active in the Southern California phone-phreaking community during the late 1970s. In a 1980 cover story for L.A. Weekly, journalist Eddie Rivera profiled De Payne under the alias "Rosco", describing him as the operator of the UFO conference line, a telephone conferencing system used by hobbyists, phone phreaks, and computer enthusiasts in the Los Angeles area.

Rivera characterized De Payne as a leading figure in the local phreaking community with extensive knowledge of telephone-network operations, corporate telephone systems, and computer networks, and noted that he maintained large collections of technical information and served as a resource for other members of the phreaking underground.

According to Cyberpunk: Outlaws and Hackers on the Computer Frontier, De Payne was among the prominent members of a Los Angeles-based group that included Kevin Mitnick, Susan Headley, and Steven Rhoades. His HOBO-UFO conference line served as a gathering place for the local phreaking community and introduced many participants to computer-related hacking as telephone systems became increasingly computerized. De Payne met Mitnick through this scene in the late 1970s and remained one of his closest associates during the formative years of the Los Angeles hacking community. He later appeared in news coverage relating to federal investigations involving Mitnick and his associates.

== See also ==
- Cyberpunk: Outlaws and Hackers on the Computer Frontier – 1991 nonfiction book by Katie Hafner and John Markoff
