= Markus Hess =

Late 1980s computer hacker

- Born: West Germany
- Occupation: Programmer
- Known for: Computer security hacking
- Website: https://thewilyhacker.de

Markus Hess is a German hacker and spy who was active in the 1980s. Alongside Dirk Brzezinski and Peter Carl, Hess hacked into networks of military and industrial computers based in the United States, Europe and East Asia, and sold the information to the Soviet KGB for US$54,000. During his time working for the KGB, Hess is estimated to have broken into 400 U.S. military computers. The hacked material included "sensitive semiconductor, satellite, space, and aircraft technologies".

== Lawrence Berkeley Laboratory ==
Hess's hacking activities were discovered in 1986 by Clifford Stoll, an astronomer turned system administrator of the computer center of the Lawrence Berkeley Laboratory (LBL) in California. Stoll's first job duty was to track a 75-cent accounting error in the LBL system. Early in his investigation, Stoll discovered that the LBL computer system was compromised and that the hacker had obtained root, or system privileges, a security compromise far more important than the accounting error. Stoll eventually discovered how the hacker had broken in and identified the hacker's activities on the system. LBL management considered attempting to seal off the system from this hacker, but Stoll and his colleagues convinced LBL's management that this would not be effective. Ultimately, they installed a honeypot to ensnare the hacker.

=== Getting in ===
With support from Dirk Brzezinski and Peter Karl, Hess' initial activities started at the University of Bremen in West Germany through the West German Datex-P network via satellite link or transatlantic cable to the Tymnet International Gateway. Tymnet was a "gateway" service that a user called into that routed them to any one of a number of computer systems that also used the service. Tymnet was one of a number of services available that provided local telephone numbers, where directly accessing the computer would have been a long-distance call. Users normally used packet switching services like Tymnet for their lower costs. Once he accessed Tymnet, Hess branched out to the Jet Propulsion Laboratory in Pasadena, California, and to the Tymnet Switching System. It was through this switching system that he accessed the LBL computers.

Hess was able to attack 400 U.S. military computers by using LBL to "piggyback" to ARPANET and MILNET. ARPANET was a civilian wide area network created by the Department of Defense, which would later become what is now known as the Internet. MILNET was its military counterpart.

=== Targets ===
The facilities that Hess breached included:

- SRI International – Menlo Park, California, U.S.
- U.S. Army Darcom – Seckenheim, West Germany
- Fort Buckner, Camp Foster – Okinawa Prefecture, Japan
- U.S. Army 24th Infantry – Fort Stewart, Georgia, U.S.
- U.S. Navy Coastal Systems Computer – Panama City, Florida, U.S.
- U.S. Air Force – Ramstein Air Base, West Germany
- Massachusetts Institute of Technology MX Computer, Cambridge, Massachusetts, U.S.
- OPTIMIS Database – The Pentagon, U.S.
- United States Air Force Systems Command – El Segundo, California, U.S.
- Anniston Army Depot – Anniston, Alabama, U.S.

=== Tracking Hess and his capture ===
Stoll, with the help of local authorities, traced the call to a Tymnet switch in Oakland, California. Because the call came from Oakland rather than Berkeley, it was obvious that the hacker was not working local to the university. Tymnet officials helped LBL trace the various calls, even though the hacker attempted to conceal their origin. Enlisting the aid of AT&T and the Federal Bureau of Investigation (FBI), Stoll eventually determined that the calls were being "piggybacked" across the United States, but originated from the West German city of Hanover.

Stoll trapped Hess by creating records of a bogus military project conducted on LBL computers; according to The Cuckoo's Egg, he and his girlfriend conceived this plan while showering, giving it the unofficial name of "Operation Showerhead". While the bogus information was convincing, the primary goal was simply to keep the hacker connected long enough to trace his connection, and with the hope that the hacker might send a written request for further information listed as available in hard copy. This simple technique worked: a request for the additional information was received from a Pittsburgh, Pennsylvania address.

At the time, this type of hacking was unheard of, and it was a considerable challenge to get the cooperation of the FBI and the West German government. Eventually, the West German authorities were able to break in and arrest Hess. Hess went to trial in 1990, and Stoll testified against him. Hess was found guilty of espionage and was given a 20-month suspended sentence.

== Literature and films ==
After Hess's capture, Stoll wrote about his efforts to track and locate Hess in the technical paper "Stalking the Wily Hacker" for the journal Communications of the ACM and the book The Cuckoo's Egg for the general public. The Cuckoo's Egg was adapted into a 1990 Nova episode "The KGB, The Computer, and Me".

"23", a semi-fictional 1998 German movie about the incident, merges Hess with other involved hackers into a single character, David.

== See also ==
- Chaos Computer Club
- List of hackers
