= Katie Hafner =

American journalist (born 1957)

- Born: December 5, 1957 (age 68); Rochester, New York, U.S.
- Occupations: Author; journalist
- Spouses: Matthew Lyon (m. 1992; died 2002) Robert M. Wachter (m. 2012)
- Children: 1
- Writing career
- Notable works: Contributing editor for Newsweek and Business Week.; Articles for Esquire, Wired, The New Republic and The New York Times Magazine.
- Website: www.katiehafner.com

Katie Hafner (born December 5, 1957) is an American journalist and author. She is a former staff member of The New York Times, and has written articles and books on subjects including technology and history. She co-produces and hosts the podcast series Lost Women of Science. Her first novel, The Boys, was published in 2022.

== Early life and education ==
Hafner was born in Rochester, New York, and raised in Amherst, Massachusetts. She earned a bachelor's degree in German literature from the University of California at San Diego in 1979 and a master's degree from the Columbia University Graduate School of Journalism in 1981.

== Career ==
Beginning in 1983, Hafner worked as a reporter at Computerworld and then at The San Diego Union. She became a staff editor at Business Week in 1986, leaving in 1989. From 1990 to 1994, she worked freelance, writing articles and books, before becoming technology correspondent at Newsweek. In February 1998 she became a writer for the weekly Circuits section of The New York Times, where she remained on staff for a decade. She has also written for Esquire, Wired, The Golfer’s Journal, The New Republic, and The New York Times Magazine.

Hafner's first book was Cyberpunk: Outlaws and Hackers on the Computer Frontier (1991), an exploration of youth computer-hacking in three parts, co-written with John Markoff. In 1996, with her then husband, Matthew Lyon, she published Where Wizards Stay Up Late: The Origins of the Internet. This was one of the earliest in-depth and comprehensive histories of the ARPANET and how it led to the Internet. It explored the "human dimension" of the development of the ARPANET covering the "theorists, computer programmers, electronic engineers, and computer gurus who had the foresight and determination to pursue their ideas and affect the future of technology and society". Her 2001 book on the online community The WELL, an expansion of a 1997 article for Wired, was praised there for "flashes of genuine insight". Her sixth book, Mother Daughter Me (2013), a memoir about trying to live with her mother and her teenage daughter in a house in San Francisco, was named one of "Ten Titles to Pick Up Now" in the August 2013 issue of O Magazine and was on other lists of recommendations including Parade magazine's 2013 "Summer Reading List".

Her first novel, The Boys, was published in July 2022, the first novel to be published by the relaunched Spiegel & Grau.

Hafner's 2006 New York Times article "Growing Wikipedia Refines its 'Anyone Can Edit' Policy" is included in the second edition of The McGraw-Hill Guide Writing for College, Writing for Life, an English composition textbook.

She is on the advisory board of the Internet Hall of Fame. She is interviewed in the John Korty documentary Miracle in a Box, about the rebuilding of a Steinway piano.

Hafner is co-executive producer and host of the podcast series Lost Women of Science. The first season tells the story of Dr. Dorothy Andersen, the first person to identify and describe cystic fibrosis. The second season is the story of Klára Dán von Neumann, one of the first women to work as a computer programmer. The third season is about Yvonne Young Clark, the first woman to earn a degree in mechanical engineering from Howard University and the first Black member of the Society of Women Engineers.

== Personal life ==
Hafner's first husband was John Markoff. They divorced and she married Matthew Lyon, a university administrator, in 1992; they had a daughter. He died in February 2002. In 2012 she remarried to Robert M. Wachter, who is chairman of the Department of Medicine at the University of California, San Francisco. In June 2022, he announced that she probably had long COVID. In March 2023 she participated in an hour-long podcast with Roy Wood Jr. on the Matilda effect.

== Books ==
- Cyberpunk: Outlaws and Hackers on the Computer Frontier (with John Markoff) (Simon & Schuster, 1991) ISBN 0-684-81862-0
- The House at the Bridge: A Story of Modern Germany (Scribner, 1995) ISBN 0-684-19400-7
- Where Wizards Stay Up Late: The Origins of the Internet (with Matthew Lyon) (Simon & Schuster, 1996) ISBN 0-684-83267-4
- The Well: A Story of Love, Death and Real Life in the Seminal Online Community (Carroll & Graf, 2001) ISBN 0-7867-0846-8
- A Romance on Three Legs: Glenn Gould's Obsessive Quest for the Perfect Piano (Bloomsbury, 2008) ISBN 0-7710-3754-6
- Mother Daughter Me (Random House, 2013) ISBN 140006936X
- The Boys (Spiegel & Grau, 2022) ISBN 978-1-954118-14-0
