= Clifford Stoll =

American astronomer, author and teacher (born 1950)

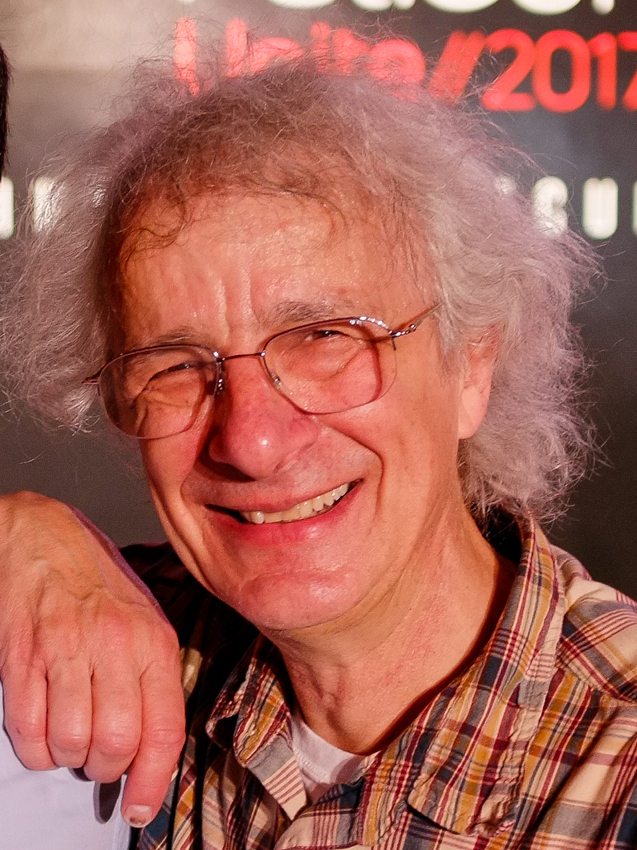
- Stoll in 2017
- Born: Clifford Paul Stoll Jr. June 4, 1950 (age 76); Buffalo, New York, U.S.
- Other name: Cliff
- Education: SUNY Buffalo (BS); University of Arizona (PhD)
- Spouse: Patricia Stoll
- Call sign: K7TA (previously WN2PSX)
- Scientific career
- Fields: Astronomy
- Thesis: Polarimetry of Jupiter at large phase angles (1980)
- Doctoral advisor: Martin Tomasko

Clifford Paul "Cliff" Stoll (born June 4, 1950) is an American astronomer, author and teacher.

He is most notable for his investigation in 1986, while working as a system administrator at the Lawrence Berkeley National Laboratory, that led to the capture of hacker Markus Hess, and for Stoll's subsequent book The Cuckoo's Egg, in which he details the investigation.

Stoll has written three books as well as articles in the non-specialist press (e.g., in Scientific American) on the Curta mechanical calculator and the slide rule, and is a frequent contributor to the mathematics YouTube channel Numberphile.

== Early life and education ==
Cliff Stoll attended Hutchinson Central Technical High School in Buffalo, New York. He earned a B.S. in Astronomy in 1973 from the University at Buffalo (SUNY). While studying for his undergraduate degree at SUNY Buffalo, Stoll worked in the university's electronic music laboratory and was mentored by Robert Moog.

He received his PhD from the University of Arizona in 1980.

== Career ==
External videos
- Booknotes interview with Stoll on The Cuckoo's Egg, December 3, 1989, C-SPAN

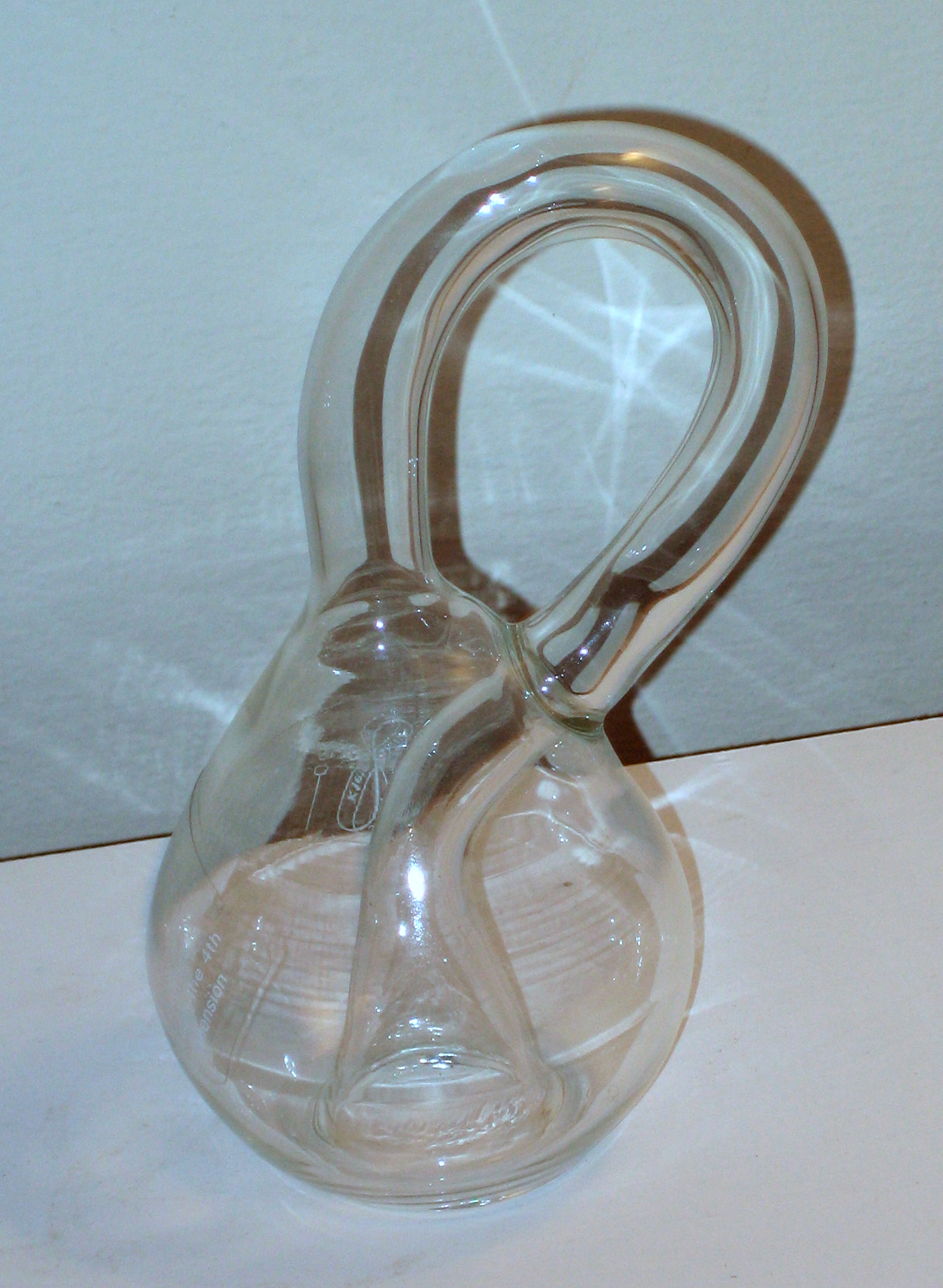
One of Stoll's Klein bottles

During the 1960s and 1970s, Stoll was assistant chief engineer at WBFO, a public radio station in his hometown of Buffalo, New York.

In 1986, while employed as a systems administrator at the Lawrence Berkeley National Laboratory, Stoll investigated a tenacious hacker—later identified as KGB recruit Markus Hess—who stole passwords, pirated multiple computer accounts, and attempted to breach US military security. After identifying the intrusion, Stoll set up a honeypot for Hess by using a non-existent department at the National Laboratory, allegedly cooperating with the US Department of Defense, eventually tracking him down and passing details to the authorities. Stoll spent 10 months trying to track the hacker's whereabouts and eventually managed to do so when a hacker tried to gain access to the computer of a DoD contractor in Virginia. It is recognized as one of the first examples of digital forensics. At the time, gaining cooperation from law enforcement was a challenge due to the relatively new nature of the crime. He described the events of his investigation in The Cuckoo's Egg: Tracking a Spy Through the Maze of Computer Espionage and the paper "Stalking the Wily Hacker". Stoll's book was later chronicled in an episode of WGBH's NOVA titled "The KGB, the Computer, and Me", which aired on PBS stations in 1990.

In his 1995 book Silicon Snake Oil and an accompanying article in Newsweek, Stoll raised questions about the influence of the Internet on future society, and whether it would be beneficial. He made various predictions in the article, such as calling e-commerce nonviable (due to a lack of personal contact and secure online funds transfers) and the future of printed news publications ("no online database will replace your daily newspaper"). When the article resurfaced on Boing Boing in 2010, Stoll left a self-deprecating comment: "Of my many mistakes, flubs, and howlers, few have been as public as my 1995 howler ... Now, whenever I think I know what's happening, I temper my thoughts: Might be wrong, Cliff ..."

Stoll was an eighth-grade physics teacher at Tehiyah Day School, in El Cerrito, California, and later taught physics to home-schooled teenagers. Stoll was a regular contributor to MSNBC's The Site. Stoll is an FCC licensed amateur radio operator with the call sign K7TA. He appears frequently on Brady Haran's YouTube channel Numberphile.

Stoll sells blown glass Klein bottles on the internet through his company Acme Klein Bottles. He stores his inventory in the crawlspace underneath his home in Oakland, California, and accesses it when needed with a homemade miniature robotic forklift.

== Books ==
- Clifford Stoll (1989). The Cuckoo's Egg. New York: Doubleday. ISBN 0-370-31433-6.
- Clifford Stoll (1995). Silicon Snake Oil: Second Thoughts on the Information Highway. ISBN 0-330-34442-0.
- Clifford Stoll (2000). High-Tech Heretic: Reflections of a Computer Contrarian. Knopf Doubleday Publishing. ISBN 0-385-48976-5.
  - German translation: Clifford Stoll (2002). LogOut. Fischer-Taschenbuch-Verlag. ISBN 3-596-15512-6.
