= Nick Levay =

American computer security expert (1977–2021)

Nick Levay (Rattle)
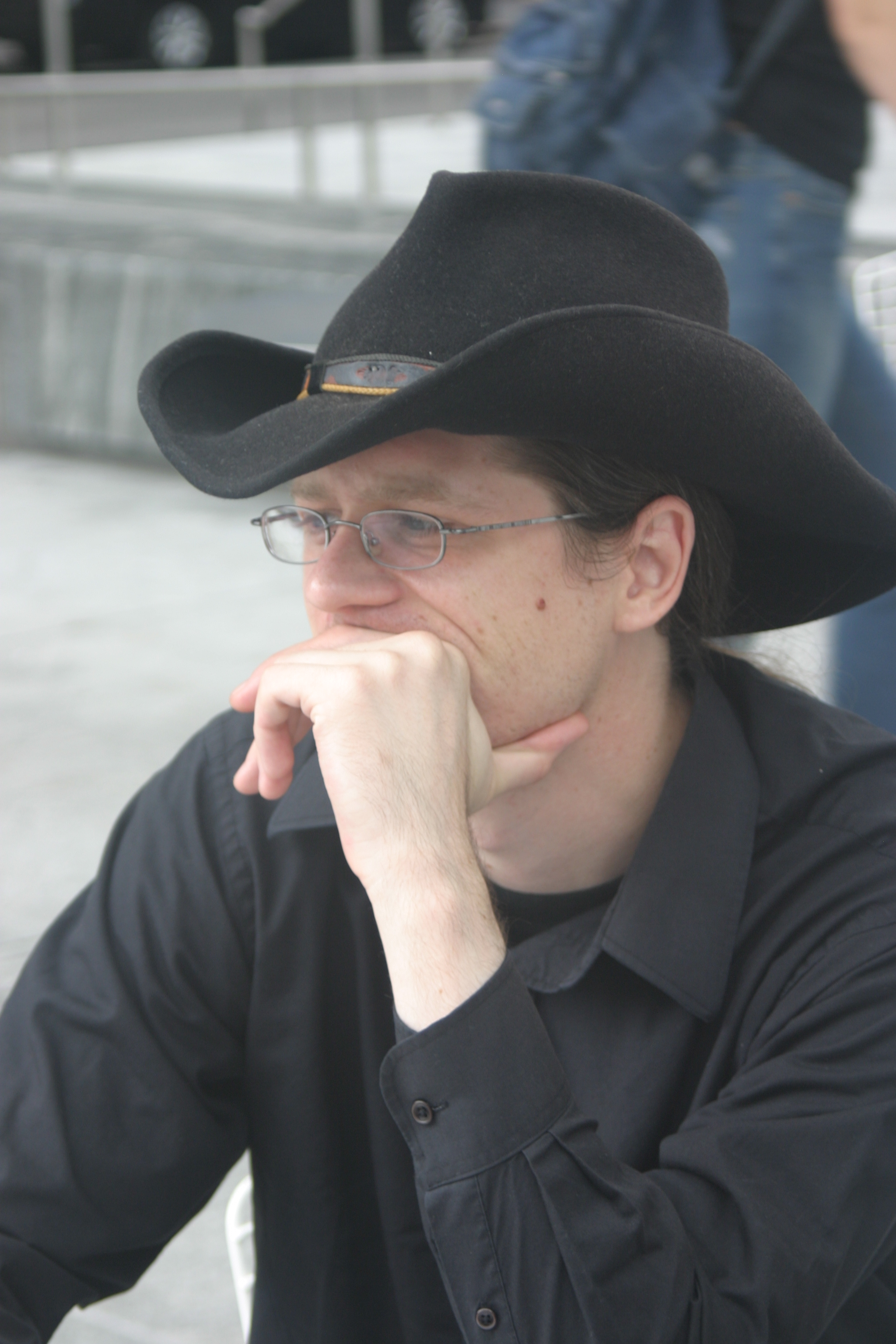
- Nick Levay (Rattle), 2006
- Born: April 21, 1977; New Jersey
- Died: July 16, 2021 (aged 44); New Jersey
- Education: Middle Tennessee State University
- Known for: MemeStreams, Chief Security Officer at the Council on Foreign Relations, Carbon Black, Center for American Progress
- Website: http://nicklevay.net

Nick Levay (1977–2021) also known as Rattle was an American computer security expert and hacker. He was the Chief Security Officer at the Council on Foreign Relations and other organizations such as Carbon Black and the Center for American Progress. From 2018–2021 he was the President of the NGO-ISAC, an Information Sharing and Analysis Center nonprofit serving US-based non-governmental organizations.

== Early career as Rattle ==
Levay was born in 1977 in New Jersey, and learned at a young age that he had an affinity for hardware and liked to take things apart to see how they worked. When he was four, his parents gave him a toolbox, which he says he immediately used to take apart the clothes dryer. When he was six, his father gave him an IBM PCjr, but he found that programming didn't hold his interest. He preferred things such as radio and remote-controlled cars. When he received an Apple IIc and a 300 baud modem though, he was much more intrigued when he realized that computers could be used to communicate.

=== Origin of the Rattle name ===
When he was 12 and was talking to someone on CB Radio, he was asked for his handle, but didn't have an answer. The person on the other end spontaneously dubbed him as Rattle. Levay liked the name and continued to use it, and then when he got involved with computers and needed a pseudonym for BBSes, he kept the same name. He self-identified as a hacker, and also set up his own BBS.

When it came time for college, Levay decided that he wanted to combine his interests in hardware and music, and to study audio engineering. He moved to Nashville where he attended Middle Tennessee State University, receiving a degree in music business and communications management. He continued to connect with other hackers in the area, joining the Nashville chapter of se2600, a splinter group of the national 2600 culture. He and his friends organized an annual convention for hackers and technology enthusiasts in the Nashville area, PhreakNIC. They also became the subjects of a pioneering profile of hacker culture in 1999, "Cyber Pirates" in the Nashville Scene.

== Computer security professional ==
In 2001, Levay and computer security expert Tom Cross co-founded the company Industrial Memetics, building an early social-networking website and blog, MemeStreams. He also began contractor work with various organizations as a computer security consultant. He was the director of global systems engineering for iAsiaWorks, building data centers in southeast Asia.

In 2007 he started as a contractor at the Center for American Progress, where he established monitoring systems and redesigned the organization's network. Over the next few years he was promoted to the Director of Technical Operations and Information Security. He left in 2013 to become Chief Security Officer at Bit9 (later VMware Carbon Black), joining after that company suffered a major data breach.

In 2015 he moved on to become the Chief Security Officer at the Council on Foreign Relations, serving there until 2018, after which he formed the NGO-ISAC, an Information Sharing and Analysis Center for Non-governmental Organizations. It is a nonprofit focused on facilitating communication among US-based NGOs and nonprofits which are being attacked from threat actors, allowing the NGOs to share threat information and coordinate things such as contingency plan exercises.

== Public speaking ==
Active in the computer security convention community, Levay was a frequent participant at conventions such as Def Con, and presented at PhreakNIC, an annual hacker and technology convention held in Nashville. A 2011 talk there was on "Counter Espionage Strategy and Tactics".
