= Lazlow Jones =

American writer and voice actor

Lazlow
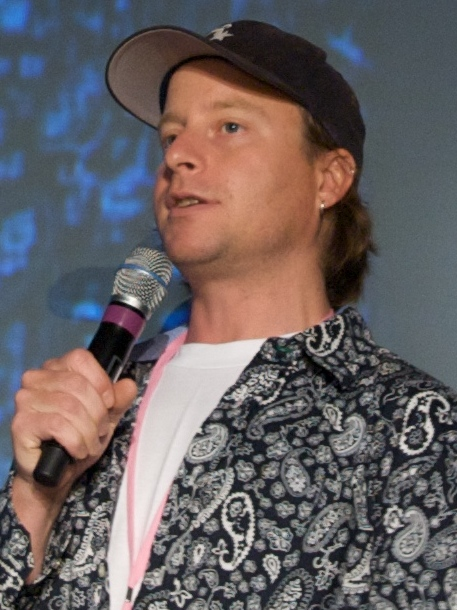
- Lazlow at The Last HOPE in July 2008
- Born: Jeffrey Crawford Jones; September 4, 1973 (age 53)
- Occupations: Radio personality; video game producer; writer; talk show host
- Website: www.lazlow.com

Jeffrey Crawford Jones (born September 4, 1973), known professionally as Lazlow Jones or simply Lazlow, is an American writer, producer, director, voice actor, and radio personality. He is best known for his work with Rockstar Games, with which he has worked on the Grand Theft Auto, Max Payne, and Red Dead Redemption series and for his radio shows Technofile and The Lazlow Show.

== Career ==
=== Radio ===
Lazlow's show, Technofile, ran from February 1995 to July 2007.

In 2005, Lazlow launched The Lazlow Show on Sundays on WXRK-FM in New York City. After 23 shows, the program ceased on terrestrial radio in December 2005. From April 2006, the show re-launched on a non-regular basis on The ViRus, an uncensored channel on XM Satellite Radio as part of its Saturday Night Virus line-up. All episodes and extras are available for purchase on Lazlow's website. His co-hosts were Reed Tucker and "Big" Wayne. As of January 2, 2010, The Lazlow Show no longer airs; Lazlow and his staff were reportedly dissatisfied by management after Sirius and XM merged. The program has streamed live on the Internet on an irregular schedule since then. In 2014, "Big" Wayne died of a heart attack; Lazlow and Tucker hosted a special show in Wayne's memory.

=== Rockstar Games ===
==== Grand Theft Auto series ====
Lazlow has also been involved in writing, producing and doing voice-work as a fictionalized version of himself for the Grand Theft Auto series of video games. He had worked at an advertising agency as a writer and producer, along with writer Reed Tucker (who is now his talk radio show's producer) on advertisements for a variety of consumer-related products. Since Grand Theft Auto III (2001), he co-wrote the radio stations in the games with Dan Houser of Rockstar Games.

Lazlow produced, scripted and hosted the popular Chatterbox FM radio station in Grand Theft Auto III.

Lazlow took a larger role in Grand Theft Auto: Vice City (2002). Rockstar Games hired his production company to co-write and produce all the radio stations in Vice City and the pedestrian dialogue. In this game, which takes place in 1986, he is the host of the Vice City radio station V-Rock. In Grand Theft Auto: San Andreas (2004), Lazlow co-wrote and produced the in-game media and hosted Entertaining America on WCTR after the original host Billy Dexter was killed by fictional character Jack Howitzer on air.

Lazlow "returned" as the host of Chatterbox radio show in Grand Theft Auto: Liberty City Stories (2005), although in a minor role in the game's chronology (which takes place in 1998) that has Chatterbox as a show on a channel, not an entire channel of its own. During his show on the Public Access station, he hints that he will be getting his own channel during a call that frustrates him, when he says that "Me and my buddy Donald [Love] have big plans for this station. C-box 24/7!"

Lazlow "returned" in Grand Theft Auto: Vice City Stories (2006), which is set in 1984, as an intern at V-Rock working for his real-life friend, Couzin Ed. In their real-life radio careers, Lazlow was the sidekick of Couzin Ed, whom he would almost always tease on the radio.

Lazlow is the host of radio station Integrity 2.0 in Grand Theft Auto IV (2008) and Grand Theft Auto: Episodes from Liberty City (2009). Integrity's sole program consists of his on-site reporting from around Liberty City. He provides the ZiT! service, where listeners can request the artist and title of the song currently playing on the radio. He is also credited among others for creating the conversations of pedestrians in Liberty City. He has an in-game criminal record, as can be seen in the Liberty City Police Department database.

On September 15, 2013, Lazlow presented a special radio show alongside Pete Donaldson on Absolute Radio in the United Kingdom to celebrate the launch of Grand Theft Auto V. He confirmed that he had been working on the game for the last five years. He appears in the game as a co-host of the talk radio show called Chattersphere and as the host of the TV talent competition Fame or Shame. He makes his first on-screen appearance in the series in the mission "Fame or Shame" in which he is chased and threatened by protagonists Michael De Santa and Trevor Philips. He also appears in person during the mission "Reuniting the Family" where Michael physically assaults Lazlow by giving him multiple tattoos and piercings. In 2018, he makes a brief appearance in some missions of the After Hours update in Grand Theft Auto Online. Afterwards, he is seen having fun or despair in the player's nightclub (which was included with the update) depending on the club's popularity.

Lazlow has arranged voice cameos in the Grand Theft Auto series for several key figures from the magazine 2600: The Hacker Quarterly, including Emmanuel Goldstein, Bernie S. and Kevin Mitnick.

==== Other series ====
Lazlow has also collaborated with Rockstar Games on Red Dead Redemption and Max Payne 3, co-writing and directing pedestrian dialogue and in-game media. He was also a writer and audio director on Red Dead Redemption 2 in 2018.

==== Rockstar departure and post-exit ====
In April 2020, Lazlow departed Rockstar after nearly 20 years at the company, citing personal reasons. He has since operated Radio Lazlow, an independent production company working on projects for studios like Disney and Netflix. Lazlow co-founded Absurd Ventures with co-founder of Rockstar, Dan Houser, who also left the company in 2020.

=== Other projects ===
Lazlow has written articles for Playboy and the Long Island Press, and was an occasional guest on the Opie and Anthony and Ron and Fez shows on SiriusXM. He is affiliated with 2600, having appeared on their Off the Hook radio show, their film Freedom Downtime and as a panellist and staffer at several of the H.O.P.E. conferences.
