= StankDawg =

American computer programmer (born 1971)

David Blake
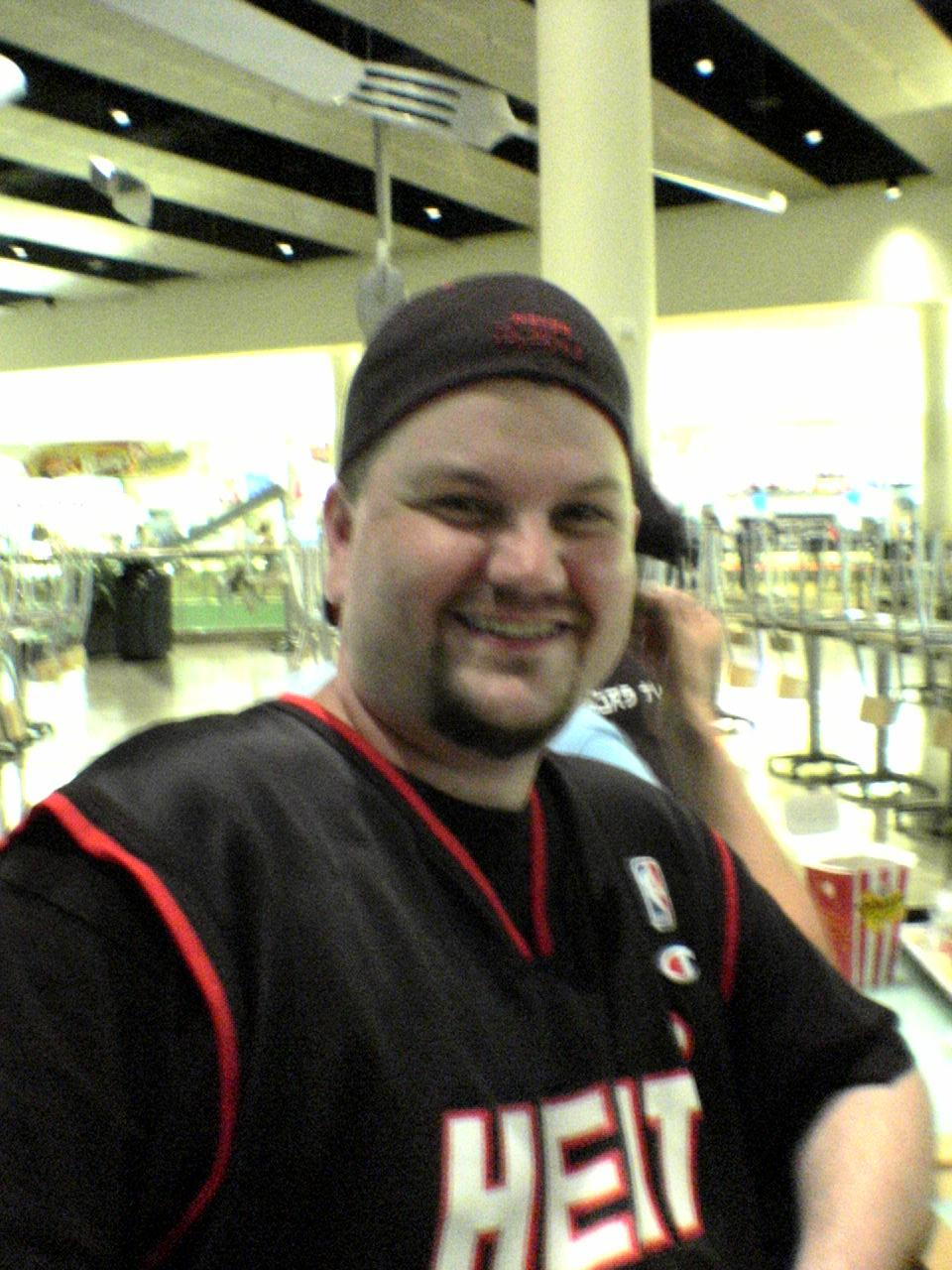
- StankDawg at Def Con 14. (2006)
- Born: 1971 (age 54–55)
- Other name: StankDawg

David Blake (born 1971), also known as StankDawg, is the founder of the hacking group Digital DawgPound (DDP) and a long-time member of the hacking community. A regular presenter at multiple hacking conferences, he is best known as the creator of the "Binary Revolution" initiative, including being the founding host and producer of Binary Revolution Radio, a long-running weekly Internet radio show which ran 200 episodes from 2003 to 2007. He also founded a group called Digital DawgPound, whose members regularly published articles in hacking magazines such as 2600: The Hacker Quarterly. He also co-hosted the first episode of Hacker Public Radio, an initiative which is still active as of 2026.

== Biography ==
Blake was born in Newport News, Virginia on September 13, 1971. He received an AAS (Associates in Applied Sciences) degree from the University of Kentucky 1992, and a BS in Computer Science from Florida Atlantic University as well as a CEH certificate. In 2007 he was living and working as a computer programmer/analyst in Orlando, Florida.

== Publications and presentations ==
StankDawg is a staff writer for the well-known hacker periodical 2600: The Hacker Quarterly, as well as the now-defunct Blacklisted! 411 magazine. He has also been a contributing writer to several independent zines such as Outbreak, Frequency, and Radical Future. He has been a frequent co-host of Default Radio and was a regular on Radio Freek America. Additionally, he has appeared on GAMERadio, Infonomicon, The MindWar, Phreak Phactor, and HPR (Hacker Public Radio).

He has presented at technology conferences such as DEF CON, H.O.P.E., and Interz0ne. His presentation "Hacking google Adwords" at Def Con 13 drew criticism from Jason Calacanis. His presentation at the fifth H.O.P.E. conference drew some surprise from the AS/400 community.

StankDawg appeared as a subject on the February 2005 television documentary "The Most Extreme" on Animal Planet where he demonstrated the vulnerabilities of wireless internet connections.

== Digital DawgPound ==
The Digital DawgPound (more commonly referred to as the "DDP") is a group of hackers, best known for a series of articles in hacker magazines such as 2600: The Hacker Quarterly and Make; the long-running webcast Binary Revolution Radio, and forums with posts from high-profile hackers such as Strom Carlson, decoder, Phiber Optik and many more. The stated mission of the DDP is to propagate a more positive image of hackers than the negative mass media stereotype. The group welcomes new members who want to learn about hacking, and attempts to instill in them the hacker ethic. Their goal is to show that hackers can make positive contributions to technology and society as a whole.

DDP membership has included several staff writers for 2600: The Hacker Quarterly and Blacklisted! 411 magazine including StankDawg and bland_inquisitor. DDP members are also regular speakers at hacking conferences such as DEF CON, H.O.P.E., Interzone, and Notacon. Posts by DDP members have been featured on other technology-related sites such as Make Magazine, HackADay, and Hacked Gadgets. Some of StankDawg's writing was influential in the hacker scene, such as "The Art of Electronic Deduction".

== Binary Revolution ==
In 2003, StankDawg moved the forums from his personal site over to a new site as part of a project called the Binary Revolution, which he considered a "movement" towards a more positive hacking community.

Binary Revolution Radio, often shortened to "BRR", was one part of the binrev community. Started by Blake in 2003 and active until 2007, it featured different co-hosts each week, and covered different aspects of hacker culture and computer security. It was broadcast via internet stream, usually prerecorded in Florida on a weekend, and then edited and released on the following Tuesday, on the DDP Hack Radio stream at 9:30pm EST. Topics included phreaking, identity theft, cryptography, operating systems, programming languages, free and open source software, Wi-Fi and bluetooth, social engineering, cyberculture, and information about various hacker conventions such as PhreakNIC, ShmooCon, H.O.P.E., and Def Con. Notable co-hosts included Tom Cross (as "Decius"), Elonka Dunin, Jason Scott, Lance James, Mark Spencer, Virgil Griffith, and MC Frontalot.

In July 2005 Blake announced that he was going to take a break, and so for the third season, the show was produced by Black Ratchet and Strom Carlson (who had been frequent co-hosts during Blake's run). During the time that they hosted the program, the format rotated between the standard prerecorded format, and a live format which included phone calls from listeners.

Blake returned to the show in May 2006. He maintained the prerecorded format, and brought more community input into the show, by bringing on more members of the Binary Revolution community. For the first episode of the fourth season, BRR had its first ever broadcast in front of a live audience during the HOPE 6 convention in New York City, June 2006. The final episode, #200, took place on October 30, 2007, with a marathon episode which clocked in at 7 hours and 12 minutes.

=== HackTV ===
In the middle of 2003, Blake released an Internet video show entitled "HackTV". In light of the difficulties of putting together the full HackTV original show, and in an attempt to make the show more accessible for community contributions, StankDawg launched a new series that was less focused on format and video quality, that instead focused more on content and ease of participation. This series was titled "HackTV:Underground" or "HTV:U" for short. One episode of HackTV:U was used by the G4techTV show called "Torrent".

== Hacker Public Radio ==
After founding and expanding miscellaneous BinRev projects, StankDawg became an early host, contributor, and administrator for the newly renamed Hacker Public Radio, where with Enigma he co-hosted HPR#1 on December 31, 2007. HPR's archive credits him with 18 episodes across HPR and its predecessor, Today with a Techie, between 2007 and 2011.

== Works by Digital DawgPound members ==
=== Printed ===
- Natas - "Backspoofing 101", Spring 2007, 2600 Magazine
- Natas - "Ownage by AdSense", Fall 2006, 2600 Magazine
- Black Ratchet - "Not Quite Dead Yet", Spring 2006, 2600 Magazine
- dual_parallel - "Port Knocking Simplified", Winter 2005, Blacklisted411 Magazine
- StankDawg - "The Art of Electronic Deduction", Winter 2005, Blacklisted411 Magazine
- dual_parallel - "Remote Encrypted Data Access", Fall 2005, Blacklisted411 Magazine
- StankDawg - "Stupid Webstats Tricks", Fall 2005, 2600 Magazine
- StankDawg - "Hacking Google AdWords", Summer 2005, 2600 Magazine
- StankDawg - "Disposable Email Vulnerabilities", Spring 2005, 2600 Magazine
- StankDawg - "0wning Universal Studios Florida", Fall 2004, Blacklisted411 Magazine
- StankDawg - "How to Hack The Lottery", Fall 2004, 2600 Magazine
- StankDawg - "Robots and Spiders", Winter 2003, 2600 Magazine
- ntheory - "Backspoofing: Let the Telco Do the Walking", July 2004, BR magazine Issue 2.1
- ntheory - "Packet8 IP Phone service", July 2004, BR magazine Issue 2.1
- dual_parallel - "White Hat Wi-Fi", July 2004, BR magazine Issue 2.1
- hacnslash - "An IR receiver for your PC", July 2004, BR magazine Issue 2.1
- StankDawg - "Hacking 101: Directory Transversal", July 2004, BR magazine Issue 2.1
- ntheory - "Hacking Coinstar", September 2003, BR magazine Issue 1.2
- w1nt3rmut3 - "Best buy insecurities: revisited", September 2003, BR magazine Issue 1.2
- bland_inquisitor - "Kismet on Knoppix HD install", September 2003, BR magazine Issue 1.2
- dual_parallel - "A Physical Security Primer for the Community", September 2003, BR magazine Issue 1.2
- logan5 - "case modeling", September 2003, BR magazine Issue 1.2
- vooduHAL - "Insecurities in my cafe cup", September 2003, BR magazine Issue 1.2
- StankDawg - "Hacking 101: Targeting Theory", September 2003, BR magazine Issue 1.2
- bland_inquisitor - "Denial of Service Attacks, Tools of the Tools", May 2003, BR magazine and Fall 2003, 2600 Magazine Issue 1.1
- StankDawg - "Hacking 101: Footprinting a system", May 2003, BR magazine Issue 1.1
- evo_tech - "Your rights and why you have already lost them", May 2003, BR magazine Issue 1.1
- nick84 & StankDawg - "2600 Secrets", May 2003, BR magazine Issue 1.1
- nick84 - "Watching the watchers", May 2003, BR magazine Issue 1.1
- dual_parallel - "Public TTYs: Description and Methodologies for Free Calling", May 2003, BR magazine Issue 1.1
- bland_inquisitor - "Cookies: The good, the bad, and the ugly", May 2003, BR magazine Issue 1.1
- StankDawg - "A newbies guide to ghettodriving", May 2003, BR magazine Issue 1.1
- w1nt3rmut3 - "Phreaking Italy", May 2003, BR magazine Issue 1.1
- w1nt3rmut3 - "Best Buy Insecurities", Spring 2003, 2600 Magazine
- bland_inquisitor - "Honeypots: Building the Better Hacker", Winter 2002, 2600 Magazine
- StankDawg - "A History of 31337sp34k", Fall 2002, 2600 Magazine
- bland_inquisitor - "Telezapper, Telemarketers, and the TCPA", Fall 2002, 2600 Magazine
- dual_parallel - "Retail Hardware Revisited", Spring 2002, 2600 Magazine
- StankDawg - "Transaction Based Systems", Spring 2002, 2600 Magazine
- dual_parallel - "Hacking Retail Hardware", Fall 2001, 2600 Magazine
- StankDawg - "Batch vs. Interactive", Summer 1999, 2600 Magazine

=== Online ===
- StankDawg - "Wardriving with Mickey", October, 2005
- dual_parallel & bland_inquisitor - "Slackware 10.2 Tips", September, 2005
- logan5 - "The iPod: It's not just for music anymore", January 2005
- bland_inquisitor - "Kodak Picture Maker: In's and Out's", December 2004
- StankDawg - "Hackers Insomnia", October 2004, Frequency zine
- dual_parallel & bland_inquisitor - "Basic Slackware Security", April, 2004
- StankDawg - "Scanning GO.MSN.COM", May 2004, Radical Future zine Issue #5
- StankDawg - "Fun with the dnL flipit chatbot", December 2003, Outbreak zine issue #14
- StankDawg & bi0s - "Inside Circuit City", December 2003, Outbreak zine issue #14
- hacnslash - "Dumpster Diving - Art or Science?", September 23, 2003
- bland_inquisitor - "Social Insecurity", December 2003, Radical Future zine Issue #4
- ntheory - "Generating Millisecond Accurate, Multi-Frequency Wave Files in Perl", July 2003
- StankDawg - "DMCA vs googlefight.com", December 2002, Outbreak zine issue #12
- StankDawg - "Basic Directory Transversal", November 2002, Outbreak zine issue #11
- StankDawg - "Hacking Movies", Winter 2002, Radical Future zine Issue #3
- StankDawg - "AIM Transcript (Campaign For Freedom)", Winter 2002, Radical Future zine Issue #3

=== Presentations ===
- StankDawg - "Binary Revolution Radio - Season 4 live!", July 2006, H.O.P.E. Number Six
- StankDawg - "The Art of Electronic Deduction", March 2006, Interz0ne 5 and July 2006, H.O.P.E. Number Six
- StankDawg - "Hacking Google AdWords", July 2005, DEF CON 13
- Black Ratchet (with Strom Carlson) - "Be Your Own Telephone Company...With Asterisk", July 2005, DEF CON 13
- StankDawg - "Hacker Radio", July 2004, The fifth H.O.P.E. (guest panelist)
- StankDawg - "AS/400: Lifting the veil of obscurity", July 2004, The fifth H.O.P.E.
- StankDawg - "Disposable Email vulnerabilities", March 2004, Interz0ne 4

== Projects ==
Projects that StankDawg was directly involved in creating/maintaining in addition to the ones mentioned above.

- DDP HackRadio - A streaming radio station with a schedule of hacking and tech related shows.
- Binary Revolution Magazine - The printed hacking magazine put out by the DDP.
- Hacker Events - A calendar for all hacking conferences, events, meetings, or other related gatherings.
- Hacker Media - A portal for all hacking, phreaking, and other related media shows.
- Phreak Phactor - The world's first Hacking reality radio show.
- WH4F - "Will Hack For Food" gives secure disposable temporary email accounts.
