= Tom Cross (computer security) =

American computer security expert (born 1976)

- Tom Cross at the Emperor (Happy Valley) Hotel in Hong Kong in 2001
- Born: 1976 (age 49–50); Toronto, Ontario, Canada
- Education: Georgia Institute of Technology
- Known for: MemeStreams

Tom Cross (born 1976), also known as Decius, is an American computer security expert and hacker.

== Early life ==
Cross was born in 1976 in Toronto, Ontario, Canada, and grew up in Tennessee. His father worked in telecommunications policy and his mother was a Registered Nurse's Assistant. He attended Brentwood High School in Brentwood, Tennessee, before attending Georgia Tech in Atlanta, receiving a bachelor's degree in computer engineering.

== Security work ==
He co-founded the EFGA (Electronic Frontiers Georgia) in 1995. In 1996, he co-founded Computer Sentry Software, known for their award-winning "CyberAngel" software, a laptop anti-theft program. From 1999 to 2000, he was Chief Engineer at Dataway, a computer security firm in San Francisco. From 2000 to 2001 he worked at iAsiaWorks, as the Director of Global Security Engineering. In 2001, he founded Industrial Memetics, which developed the popular collaborative blogging community MemeStreams.

Cross has been a speaker at several technology conferences, including PhreakNIC; Summercon; "The First International Hackers' Conference in Seoul Korea" (IS2K); "InternetWorld" in Singapore; and APRICOT, the Asia-Pacific Regional Internet Conference on Operational Technologies. He was also among the attendees at the first ever Def Con. He is known for extensive "rant" essays and speeches on technology and policy. He has also been a co-host on episodes of "Binary Revolution", as a cryptography expert.

== Writing ==
- "An open letter to PFIR on "Whois" privacy", Politech listserv, June 24, 2004
- "DNS WHOIS: Barking up the wrong tree", CircleID, June 28, 2004
- "The Road Ahead for Top-Level Domains", Vint Cerf answers three of Tom's questions in an interview, CircleID, March 13, 2006
- "Academic freedom and the hacker ethic", Communications of the ACM, June 2006.
- "Puppy smoothies: Improving the reliability of open, collaborative wikis", First Monday, September 2006.
