= Dan Houser =

English video game producer (born 1973)

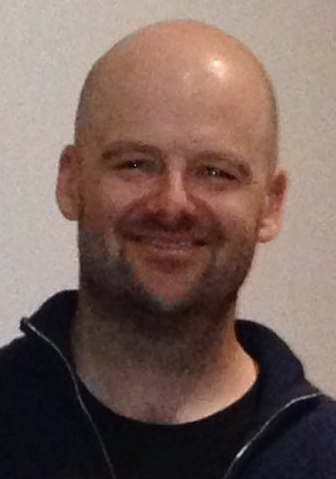
- Houser in the mid-2010s
- Born: Daniel Houser; November 1973 (age 52–53); London, England
- Citizenship: United Kingdom; United States
- Education: Christ Church, Oxford
- Occupations: Writer; video game producer
- Years active: 1995–present
- Employers: BMG Interactive (1995–1998); Rockstar Games (1998–2020); Absurd Ventures (2021–pres.)
- Spouse: Krystyna Jakubiak
- Children: 3
- Mother: Geraldine Moffat
- Relatives: Sam Houser (brother)

Daniel Houser (born November 1973) is an English writer and producer. He is one of the co-founders of Rockstar Games alongside his brother Sam Houser. He served as the head writer and vice president of creativity until his resignation in 2020. Houser founded Absurd Ventures in 2021, creating new intellectual properties across several mediums. He is a writer for the American Caper comic book series for Absurd Ventures alongside Lazlow Jones.

Prior to his departure from the company, Houser was regarded as the primary creative driving force behind much of Rockstar's output. First serving as the sole writer for Grand Theft Auto: London 1969 (1997), he went on to become the lead writer and creative director for most titles in the Grand Theft Auto series, Red Dead Redemption (2010) and Red Dead Redemption 2 (2018), Bully (2006), Midnight Club: Los Angeles (2008), and Max Payne 3 (2012).

== Early life ==
Daniel Houser was born in London in November 1973, the son of actress Geraldine Moffat and solicitor and saxophonist Walter Houser (1934–2025). He was educated at St Paul's School before matriculating in 1993 at Christ Church, Oxford, where he read geography. Despite wanting to be musicians, both Houser and his brother Sam (alongside whom he would later co-found Rockstar Games) had a fascination with storytelling from a young age. Growing up near a video library in London, they watched many American crime and cult films and Spaghetti Westerns. Houser has stated that he is a fan of the film The Warriors; Rockstar later released a video game adaptation of the film in 2005.

== Career ==
=== Early work and Rockstar Games ===
In 1995, Houser got a part-time job at BMG Interactive testing CD-ROMs; he became a full-time employee until 1996. Dan and Sam later became interested in a video game being developed by DMA Design called Race'n'Chase after getting a preview of the game. The Housers signed Race'n'Chase to BMG Interactive as the publisher and changed the name of the game to Grand Theft Auto. Following the sale of BMG Interactive to Take-Two in 1998, Houser and his brother moved with the company to New York, where they founded Rockstar Games. He has cited the 3D Mario and Zelda games on the Nintendo 64 as influences on his work.

Houser has been credited as a writer for twelve Grand Theft Auto titles and a producer for six. Despite the high profile of the Grand Theft Auto series, Houser and his brother have shied away from the celebrity spotlight, preferring to focus on the Rockstar Games brand rather than giving any one person the credit for the games' success. In 2009, both Dan and Sam Houser appeared in Time magazine's 100 most influential people of 2009 list.

Houser and his brother were inducted into the Academy of Interactive Arts & Sciences's Hall of Fame in 2014.

=== Departure from Rockstar and founding of Absurd Ventures ===
In February 2020, Rockstar Games's parent company, Take-Two Interactive, announced Houser's resignation from Rockstar Games. He left Rockstar on 11 March 2020, following an extended break in 2019. In February 2021, Houser registered two companies in Delaware: Absurd Ventures LLC and Absurd Ventures in Games LLC, the latter with a UK-based subsidiary in Altrincham. Houser is listed as the company's producer and creative director. In June 2023, Houser officially announced his involvement in the studio, which he said will "create new universes" in video games, books, graphic novels, scripted podcasts, live-action, and animation.

In November 2023, it was revealed that Lazlow Jones and Michael Unsworth had joined the company as executive producer and head of story, respectively. The company also announced its first projects: a graphic novel called American Caper and an audio series called A Better Paradise. In September 2024, Absurd Ventures announced the formation of Absurd Marin, made up of about 20 developers from Ascendant Studios, developers of Immortals of Aveum.

In January 2025, Absurd Ventures released the logo and lineup of characters for the 'Absurdaverse', a new universe with animation and a "story-driven action-comedy adventure game."

Houser has novelised A Better Paradise with the first volume published on October 14, 2025 accompanied by an audiobook edition on Audible.

In November 2025, Absurd Ventures began releasing a monthly comic book series titled American Caper, published by Dark Horse Comics, with the first trade paperback collection scheduled for release in June 2026. A French edition was announced by publisher Urban Comics and scheduled for release in September 2026.

=== Other work ===
By September 2022, Houser joined the advisory board of Revolving Games, a blockchain game studio, after investing in a US$13.2 million funding round for the company; He met co-founder Saad Zaeem some years earlier to explore ideas, but they ultimately chose different projects, leading Houser to become an adviser and investor instead.

== Personal life ==
Houser is married to entrepreneur Krystyna Jakubiak. They previously lived in Truman Capote's former home in the Brooklyn Heights neighborhood of New York City, which they purchased for US$12.5 million, the most expensive home sale in Brooklyn's history as of 2012. In 2020, they purchased Conan O'Brien's former home in the Brentwood neighborhood of Los Angeles. They have three children and own a holiday lodge along Saranac Lake, New York, built in the 1920s. Houser holds both British and American citizenship. Houser, Sam, and their wives were directors of the Houser Foundation Inc. in New York, founded in 2008; it was renamed the Krystyna and Dan Houser Foundation in 2024. Houser serves on the boards of the Rainforest Alliance and Brooklyn Museum.

== Works ==
=== Video games ===
Year	Title	Role(s)
1999	Grand Theft Auto: London 1969	Producer, writer
1999	Grand Theft Auto 2	Producer, writer
2001	Grand Theft Auto III	Producer, writer, audio director
2001	Smuggler's Run 2: Hostile Territory	Executive producer, writer, dialog director
2002	Smuggler's Run: Warzones	Executive producer, writer
2002	Grand Theft Auto: Vice City	Producer, writer, audio director
2003	Midnight Club II	Producer, soundtrack
2004	Grand Theft Auto: San Andreas	Producer, writer, audio director
2005	Grand Theft Auto: Liberty City Stories	VP of Creative, writer, voice actor
2006	Grand Theft Auto: Vice City Stories	VP of Creative, writer, voice actor
2006	Bully	VP of Creative, writer
2008	Grand Theft Auto IV	VP of Creative, writer
2008	Midnight Club: Los Angeles	VP of Creative, writer
2009	Grand Theft Auto IV: The Lost and Damned	VP of Creative, writer
2009	Grand Theft Auto: Chinatown Wars	VP of Creative, writer
2009	Grand Theft Auto: The Ballad of Gay Tony	VP of Creative, writer
2010	Red Dead Redemption	VP of Creative, executive producer, writer
2010	Red Dead Redemption: Undead Nightmare	VP of Creative, executive producer, writer
2011	L.A. Noire	VP of Creative, executive producer
2012	Max Payne 3	VP of Creative, executive producer, writer
2013	Grand Theft Auto V	VP of Creative, writer
2018	Red Dead Redemption 2	VP of Creative, executive producer, writer
2019	Red Dead Online	VP of Creative, executive producer, writer
TBD	Untitled A Better Paradise game	TBA
TBD	Untitled Absurdaverse game	TBA

=== Others ===
Year	Title	Role(s)	Notes
2024	A Better Paradise: Volume One: An Aftermath	Writer, creator	Fiction podcast
2025	A Better Paradise Volume One: An Aftermath	Author	Novel, audiobook
2025–2026	American Caper	Writer, creator	Comic book series
