= Geraldine Moffat =

British actress (born 1939)

- Born: 5 September 1939 (age 86); Nottingham, England
- Education: Bristol Old Vic Theatre School
- Occupation: Actress
- Years active: 1963–1980, 2013
- Known for: Get Carter (1971)
- Spouse: Walter Houser (m. 1971; died 2025)
- Children: Sam and Dan Houser

Geraldine Houser (née Moffat; born 5 September 1939) is a British actress. She trained at Bristol Old Vic Theatre School.

== Career ==
Originally a stage actress, Moffat went on to appear in several British television series during the 1960s and 1970s, including Department S. Her early work included the Alun Owen TV plays Stella and Doreen (1968 and 1969), directed by Alan Clarke. Commenting on Stella, Richard T. Kelly wrote that Moffat is "lovingly framed by Clarke as though she were Monica Vitti". Her appearances in these productions brought her to the attention of film director Mike Hodges, who cast her in his thriller Get Carter (1971) opposite Michael Caine. According to George Bass of the British Film Institute, "To gangster movie fans, Moffat will forever be remembered as the duplicitous Glenda, a criminal mistress who has a pivotal encounter with Michael Caine in 1971's Get Carter."

== Personal life ==
Moffat was married to lawyer and musician Walter Houser, a co-founder of Ronnie Scott's Jazz Club. Their two sons are video game producers Sam and Dan Houser, creators of the Grand Theft Auto series. In 2008, she expressed unhappiness at how controversy over the games had caused her sons to be viewed in the UK: "They are a massive success story, yet they are being vilified in their own country. We should be celebrating them. It's disgraceful. British filmmakers are revered when they reach this level of success, even when they make violent movies." She had a cameo role as Mrs Philips in Grand Theft Auto V.

== Filmography ==
=== Film ===
Year	Title	Role	Notes
1963	From Russia with Love	Gypsy	Uncredited
1970	The Man Who Had Power Over Women	Lydia Blake	
1971	Get Carter	Glenda	
1971	Quest for Love	Stella	
1974	The Last Chapter	Carlotta	Short film

=== Television ===
Year	Title	Role	Notes
1963	Emergency Ward 10	Nurse White	4 episodes
1965	Cluff	Dorothy Horrisey	Episode: "The Daughters"
1965	Riviera Police	Monique	Episode: "That Kind of Girl"
1965, 1967	Theatre 625	Brenda/April	2 episodes
1965–1969	The Wednesday Play	Various	4 episodes
1966	The Baron	Cristina Vitale	Episode: "Time to Kill"
1966	Pardon the Expression	Samantha	Episode: "Big Hotel"
1966	Danger Man	Magda Kallai	Episode: "Someone Is Liable to Get Hurt"
1966	Adam Adamant Lives!	Prudence	Episode: "The League of Uncharitable Ladies"
1966	Pardon the Expression	Samantha	Episode: "Big Hotel"
1966	No Hiding Place	Vivienne King	Episode: "Leo Did the Picking and It All Went Bad"
1966–1970	Thirty-Minute Theatre	Various	3 episodes
1967	Champion House	Stella Shaw	Episode: "The One That Got Away"
1967	Love Story	Peggy Harris	Episode: "The Swordfighter"
1968	ITV Playhouse	Edgworth Bass	Episode: "Rogue's Gallery"
1968–1970	Z-Cars	Kathy Egerton/Karen Dunn	Episodes: "A Matter for Thought"/"Threats and Menaces"
1969	Out of the Unknown	Angie	Episode: "The Little Black Bag"
1969	Department S	Janet	Episode: "Six Days"
1969	Strange Report	Tessa O'Neill	Episode: "REPORT 0846 LONELYHEARTS 'Who killed Dan Cupid?'"
1970	Paul Temple	Elsie	Episode: "Mr. Wallace Predicts"
1970	UFO	Jean Regan	Episode: "The Cat with Ten Lives"
1971	Take Three Girls	Jill	Episode: "A Little Blindness"
1971	The Persuaders!	Senka	Episode: "The Man in the Middle"
1972	Jason King	Claudia	Episode: "The Constance Missal"
1973	The Protectors	Maria Milworth	Episode: "Goodbye George"
1973–1975	Crown Court	Shirley Sorenson/Mrs. Gorman	3 episodes
1973–1980	Coronation Street	Arlene Jones/Vicki	4 episodes
1974	Armchair Theatre	Diane	Episode: "If You Could See What I Can See"
1974	Father Brown	Elizabeth Barnes	Episode: "The Hammer of God"
1975	Six Days of Justice	Kay Grant	Episode: "A Juicy Case"
1975–1976	Within These Walls	Aileen Cruddly	3 episodes
1976	The New Avengers	Jo	Episode: "House of Cards"
1976	The Sweeney	Sheila Martin	Episode: "May"
1978	Will Shakespeare	Eleanor Bull	Episode: "Dead Shepherd"

=== Radio ===
- A Life of Bliss (1967) as Beverley Watson, secretary; with Colin Gordon, Brenda Bruce and George Cole

=== Video games ===
Year	Title	Role	Notes
2013	Grand Theft Auto V	Mrs Philips	Voice; uncredited
