= WUSB =

WUSB may refer to:

- WUSB (FM) (90.1 MHz), radio station of the State University of New York at Stony Brook
- Wireless USB, a wireless extension to USB
- World Union of Saint Bernards, an association of breed clubs for the St. Bernard (dog breed)
