= Absurd Ventures =

American media and entertainment company

Absurd Ventures LLC
- Type: Private
- Industry: Media; entertainment; video games
- Founded: February 17, 2021; 5 years ago
- Founder: Dan Houser
- Headquarters: Santa Monica, California
- Number of locations: 2 (2025)
- Key people: Dan Houser (CEO, creative director); Greg Borrud (head of games)
- Number of employees: ~50 (2025)
- Subsidiaries: Absurd Marin
- Website: absurdventures.com

Absurd Ventures LLC is an American media, entertainment, and video game company headquartered in Santa Monica, California, with an additional studio in San Rafael, California. The company was founded by Dan Houser in February 2021. The company aims to create new intellectual properties across various mediums, including video games, live-action and animated television, film, fiction podcasts, books, and comic books.

== History ==
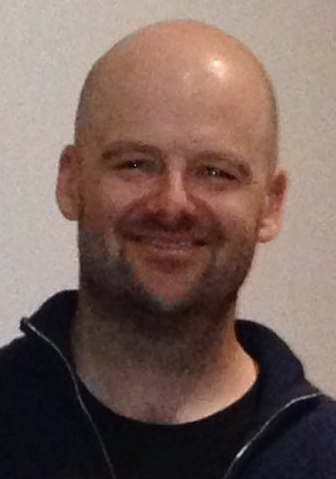
Dan Houser founded Absurd Ventures in 2021.

After leaving Rockstar Games in 2020, Dan Houser established Absurd Ventures to explore new creative avenues. The media, entertainment, and video game company aims to create new intellectual properties across various mediums, including video games, live-action and animated television, film, fiction podcasts, books, and comic books. Houser registered Absurd Ventures LLC in Delaware on February 17, 2021, and incorporated Absurd Ventures in Games in Altrincham on June 23. He announced the company in June 2023. Headquartered in Santa Monica, California, its mission is to "create new universes and to tell great stories, wherever and however we can".

Houser is the chief executive officer and creative director. Several other former Rockstar employees joined Absurd Ventures, including marketing executive Adam Tedman in 2022, producer Lazlow Jones in June 2023, and writer Michael Unsworth in October. Wendy Smith, formerly of Creative Artists Agency, joined the company as chief operating officer in November. Pandemic Studios co-founder Greg Borrud is the company's head of games. In June 2024, the company partnered with QCode to release A Better Paradise Volume One: An Aftermath, an audio fiction series exploring themes of artificial intelligence and virtual reality. The series debuted at number one on Apple's Fiction charts. In September, the season finale received a gold Signal Award for scripted fiction.

In September 2024, Absurd Ventures expanded its operations by establishing a new studio named Absurd Marin, based in San Rafael, California. This studio was formed by integrating members from the former Ascendant Studios team, known for their work on Immortals of Aveum. Bret Robbins, the founder and game director of Ascendant Studios, was appointed as the head of Absurd Marin. The team, comprising approximately 20 developers from Immortals of Aveum, is working on a story-driven action-adventure game based on an unannounced new intellectual property. In December 2024, Absurd Ventures secured a strategic investment from South Korean game development and publishing company Smilegate.

In January 2025, the company unveiled the "Absurdaverse", featuring a diverse mix of characters. This universe includes animation projects and an upcoming story-driven action-comedy adventure game. In July, Dark Horse and Absurd Ventures announced American Caper, a 12-issue crime fiction comic book series written by Dan Houser, with additional writing by Lazlow. Additional credits include illustrations by Eisner Award-winning artist David Lapham with finishes by Chris Anderson, colored by Lee Loughridge, and lettering by Nate Piekos. Shelly Bond and Daniel Chabon are co-editors of the series. On November 12, the first issue of American Caper was released. The first trade paperback was released in June 2026.

In August 2025, Smilegate signed an agreement with Absurd Ventures to publish an upcoming AAA open-world science-fiction action-adventure game set in the A Better Paradise universe. In October 2025, Absurd Ventures released a novel adaptation of the A Better Paradise audio fiction series, published by their Absurd Ventures Press publishing imprint and distributed by Simon & Schuster, alongside an Audible audiobook narrated by Ray Porter. On September 27, Houser made his first on-camera interview appearance at LA Comic Con and discussed American Caper and other projects in development at Absurd Ventures. A video game in the A Better Paradise universe is in development. Houser felt the serious tone of A Better Paradise made it suitable as an audio series, novel, television series, and video game, while the Absurdaverse was more suited to animation and a video game, and American Caper to a comic book and trade paperback.

In March 2026, Absurd Ventures announced a book publishing imprint that will feature fiction, nonfiction, memoirs, plays, and short stories from outside writers. On March 11, Absurd Ventures Press acquired the English rights for Torsten Weitze's German fantasy series The Tower of Beggars. A series of Absurdaverse animated shorts was screened at the Netflix Is a Joke Festival in May 2026, featuring actors like Rachel Dratch, Dan Soder, Annie Lederman, and Steph Tolev.

== Projects ==
Year	Title	Type	Series	Ref.
2024	A Better Paradise Volume One: An Aftermath	Podcast series	A Better Paradise	
2025	American Caper	Comic book series	American Caper	
2025	A Better Paradise Volume One: An Aftermath	Novel & audiobook	A Better Paradise	
2026	American Caper: Red-Pilled Blues	Trade paperback	American Caper	
TBA	Untitled action-adventure game	Video game	Absurdaverse	
TBA	Untitled animated series	Series	Absurdaverse	
TBA	Untitled book	Trade paperback	American Caper	
TBA	Untitled game	Video game	A Better Paradise	
