= Electronic Frontiers Georgia =

Electronic Frontiers Georgia (EFGA) is a non-profit organization in the US state of Georgia focusing on issues related to cyber law and free speech. It was founded in 1995 by Tom Cross, Robert Costner, Chris Farris, and Robbie Honerkamp, primarily in response to the Communications Decency Act.

One of the organization's early causes was to oppose Georgia House Bill 1630 (HB1630), an attempt to ban anonymous speech on the internet in Georgia. Though the bill was passed into law, after being challenged in court by the EFGA, the ACLU, and the national Electronic Frontier Foundation (EFF), the law was deemed unconstitutional.

== Origins ==
Electronic Frontiers Georgia began after a suggestion by Stanton McCandlish of the EFF in conversations with Atlanta businessman and computer store owner Robert Costner. Costner expressed concern after Philip Elmer-DeWitt's Time magazine article claimed that pornography was pervasive on the internet. Costner was angered because he thought the article was bogus. While DeWitt later apologized for the article, the "correction by Time sought to downplay, rather than apologize for, misleading their readers". It was a precursor to the Communications Decency Act.

Seeking partners to provide in-kind donations, Costner approached the Georgia ACLU for meeting space and Comstar, an internet hosting company, for rackspace for an internet server from Costner's store.

On local newsgroups Costner announced a public meeting to be held at the ACLU's downtown offices. From this, and similar meetings, Georgia residents joined in and became part of Electronic Frontiers Georgia. Most notable were Tom Cross, Chris Farris, and Robbie Honerkamp. At a later point Andy Dustman and Scott M. Jones joined the organization in significant capacities.

The EFGA's mission is to explore the intersection of public policy and technology.

== Distinction from the EFF ==
Though often confused with the Electronic Frontier Foundation, the EFGA is a separate organization. The EFF is the premier online civil liberties organization. The EFF fostered local organizations which had similar goals and names, but which were not chapters of EFF; they were separate organizations. While seeding these organizations the EFF asked that the singular name "Electronic Frontier" not be used, but that the local independent organization use the plural, Electronic Frontiers. The groups have worked together on many projects.

Shari Steele, executive director of EFF shared a stage with Robert Costner, executive director of EFGA at Georgia Perimeter College in Clarkston, Georgia. EFF accepted an invitation to participate in the HB1630 lawsuit, and EFGA has signed onto several amicus briefs along with the EFF. The EFF is a regular participant in EFGA's Electronic Frontiers Forums.

== Projects ==
Electronic Frontiers Georgia has led various projects since its inception. These include the HB1630 lawsuit concerning internet anonymity, the Georgia Cracker anonymous remailer, encryption legislation and the S.A.F.E. bill (1997), the 1996 Washington, D.C. copyright summit challenging the Software Publishers Association's copyright enforcement policies, the U-Haul lawsuit (2000), and the defeat of the Georgia "Super DMCA" bill (2004) to ban the sale of DVRs, televisions, and related devices not approved by the cable companies. In 2005 EFGA was involved nationally with the issue of verifiable voting.

The EFGA has also been involved in fingerprinting, biometrics in ID cards, spam, and a yearly report on Georgia technology legislation.

== Georgia House Bill 1630 ==
One of the early projects of EFGA was to prevent the passage of Georgia HB1630, the Georgia Computer Systems Protection Act. Don Parsons of the 40th district, a BellSouth employee, sponsored the bill which was passed and went into effect on July 1, 1996. The act made it a crime to falsely identify oneself on the internet, such as by using a handle or screen name. There were also significant implications about hyperlinks as the law had criminal provisions concerning the use of trade names, registered trademarks, logos, and copyrighted symbols in hyperlinks. While the bill was reported as having been effectively "killed" by being tabled, the bill was passed ten days later by both houses.

EFGA's Executive Director Robert Costner went to the Georgia ACLU to see if they were interested in a legal challenge of the law, but the response from Teresa Nelson was "no" stating that it was not a significant issue. After discussions with Representative Mitchell Kaye, Costner used his personal funds to engage attorney J. Scott McClain of Boundarant, Mixson & Elmore, to frame the case in a way that it would later be of interest to groups like the American Civil Liberties Union (ACLU) and the Electronic Frontier Foundation (EFF). The next step would be for EFGA to form a coalition of plaintiffs to oppose the newly passed law.

The lawsuit was not EFGA's first reaction to the new law. In an attempt to avoid the need for a lawsuit and to minimize costs on both sides, on July 3, 1996, EFGA send a letter to Attorney General Mike Bowers asking him to issue a ruling to clarify the meaning of the law. On July 16, 1996, Bowers turned down EFGA's request and they proceeded to file the lawsuit.

This became EFGA's model for dealing with future issues. Try to deal with the matter at the lowest level before escalating it. Always deal with the issues, not the personalities. And finally, to form a broad coalition of support by engaging diverse groups in the issue. With the help of attorney J. Scott McClain, the local Georgia ACLU was brought on board. They brought in the national ACLU which took over funding of the lawsuit. EFF joined in next with a total of 13 plaintiffs joining to submit affidavits for the case.

On September 24, 1996, EFGA, along with the ACLU, EFF, and other plaintiffs filed the lawsuit against the state alleging that the Georgia law barring the use of pseudonyms and anonymous communications on the internet was unconstitutional. EFGA's position was multifaceted alleging unconstitutionality in protection of anonymous speech, free speech for news and satire in web linking, Commerce Clause violations, and unconstitutional vagueness in the language of the law.

EFGA ultimately prevailed against the state in federal court winning the preliminary injunction in 1997 effectively overturning the Georgia law against the use of pseudonyms on the internet.

== Georgia Cracker remailer ==
EFGA established and ran the Georgia Cracker anonymous remailer and the Redneck nymserver. Elements of this were featured in a television interview with Costner on a segment on 20/20 about email and privacy.

In addition to running its own anonymous remailer, the EFGA also maintained an automated list of working remailers, updated daily. In the Spring 2003 issue of 2600: The Hacker Quarterly the EFGA website was described as the best and most current source for information about anonymous remailers.

== Electronic Frontiers Forums ==
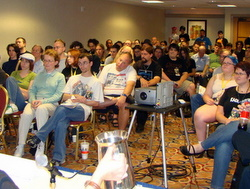
Attendees of the 2008 Electronic Frontiers Forums by Electronic Frontiers Georgia

The Electronic Frontiers Forums is a yearly event held in Atlanta, Georgia, over the Labor Day weekend each year at Dragon Con. The forums are a series of seminars held for 12 hours a day for three days.

Costner, also a founding director of Dragon Con, offered to provide content for the popular science fiction convention in exchange for meeting space to provide advocacy about issues affecting the intersection of politics and technology. Costner ran the forums each year along with the help of Scott M. Jones until Costner moved to Washington, D.C. Jones now runs the yearly event which has been in continual existence for over ten years, with the assistance of Andrew Norton

The Electronic Frontiers Forums features speakers from local law firms and local technology companies. The EFF sends a speaker some years. The topics range from legal issues to webcam models.

== Website problems ==
In late 2006 the Electronic Frontiers Georgia website went down because the domain registration fees had not been paid to Tucows and they took the domain and refused to give it back. Current EFGA activities are now handled on other EFGA websites that existed prior to the loss of the main website.
