= MemeStreams =

Social networking website

- Website type: Social content website
- Available in: English
- Owner: Industrial Memetics
- Creators: Tom Cross and Nick Levay
- Website: www.memestreams.net
- Commercial: Yes
- Registration: Free
- Launched: 2001

MemeStreams is an early social networking website, online community, and blog host that was established in 2001 by Industrial Memetics.

Created by Tom Cross and Nick Levay, the site is particularly popular among computer security professionals. Michael Lynn (Ciscogate), Virgil Griffith (Wikiscanner), Billy Hoffman (Ajax Security), and Dolemite (organizer of PhreakNIC) are all members of the site.

Memestreams employs a reputation system.
