= Smuggler's Run 2 =

2001 racing video game

Smuggler's Run 2: Hostile Territory
- Developer: Angel Studios
- Publisher: Rockstar Games
- Producer: Glen Hernandez
- Designer: Wing S. Cho
- Programmer: Charles T. Eubanks
- Artist: David McGrath
- Writers: Dan Houser; Navid Khonsari; Robert Bacon
- Platforms: PlayStation 2; GameCube
- Release: PlayStation 2: NA: October 30, 2001; PAL: November 2, 2001; GameCube: NA: August 6, 2002; PAL: October 18, 2002
- Genre: Racing
- Modes: Single-player, multiplayer

Smuggler's Run 2: Hostile Territory or simply Smuggler's Run 2 is a racing video game released for the PlayStation 2 in 2001. It is the sequel to the 2000 game Smuggler's Run. Like the first game, the player is a smuggler trying to deliver illegal cargo to destinations within 3 large maps in the game using several different types of vehicles to make deliveries in a given amount of time. A GameCube version was released in 2002 titled Smuggler's Run: Warzones.

The game was originally supposed to take place in Afghanistan but following the attacks on the World Trade Center and the subsequent invasion of Afghanistan, the developers changed the setting to the desert regions of the Caucasus.

== Gameplay ==
Similar to the original game, the overall objective in most missions is to deliver illegal contraband from a pick-up to a drop-off spot in a given amount of time. The player would also have to avoid the local army and border patrol during these missions. Now, players also have to follow vehicles without being seen, destroy enemy vehicles, and evade police after all other objectives are finished. The player is given a number of vehicles to choose from, each serving a different role and having varying strengths and weaknesses.

As in the first game, the police can drive the same cars but with much greater max speeds, the ability to go faster, slower and turn in midair to land on the player off jumps, extreme acceleration, and they can easily outnumber the player. Along with very inflexible time limits, this often leaves no room for mistakes.

== Plot ==
The player works for the smuggling company Exotic Imports, who are given missions by the Colonel - a notorious Russian arms dealer. The player is taken under the wing of Frank Luger who is in charge of Exotic Imports.

Exotic Imports are sent to Russia by the Colonel to provide shipments to the Liberation Faction, who he is now supplying instead of the FTF group. Then, due to increasing activity by the authorities, Luger is ordered to leave Russia for Vietnam.

In Vietnam, Exotic Imports smuggle the Colonel's weapons to the local Ciao Bong whilst avoiding the Bak Kan gang. Luger then learns that the American Central Intelligence Agency has become involved after capturing one of its agents. The agent informs Luger that the Russian authorities contacted the Americans for assistance in tracking 2kg of weapons-grade plutonium. This is revealed to be the cargo that Exotic Imports inadvertently transported across the Caucasus Mountains into Georgia, having been tricked by the Colonel. Luger confirms this after running a geiger counter over crates ready for movement, detecting radioactive material. Luger instructs Exotic Imports to make preparations to return to Russia so he can confront the Colonel.

In Russia the Colonel confirms that he is indeed having Exotic Imports smuggle the plutonium to the Liberation Faction, who seek to upset the balance of power. Luger, despite initially refusing to finish the work in order to avoid a potential nuclear war, relents after the Colonel agrees to pay Exotic Imports a far higher fee to do so.

Upon leaving the meeting, other members of Exotic Imports challenge Luger on what happened. Despite trying to downplay tensions by insisting they are just doing another regular job, Luger is removed from power in a coup so Exotic Imports can stop the Colonel. The player proceeds to prevent a missile launch and Luger from escaping with all of Exotic Imports' money afterwards, having stolen the passwords. As a reward - the player is given $101,500,000 as his share.

== Reception ==
Reception

Aggregate score
Aggregator	Score	
Aggregator	GameCube	PS2
Metacritic	79/100	77/100

Review scores
Publication	Score	
Publication	GameCube	PS2
AllGame	N/A	3.5/5
Electronic Gaming Monthly	8.5/10	7.5/10 (Note: In Electronic Gaming Monthly's review of the PlayStation 2 version, one critic gave it 8.5/10, and the rest gave it each a score of 7/10.)
EP Daily	N/A	7.5/10
Eurogamer	N/A	7/10
Game Informer	7.75/10	7.5/10
GameRevolution	N/A	B
GameSpot	7.8/10	8.3/10
GameSpy	3/5	93%
GameZone	8.8/10	N/A
IGN	8.4/10	8.7/10
Next Generation	N/A	4/5
Nintendo Power	3.6/5	N/A
Official U.S. PlayStation Magazine	N/A	4.5/5
Maxim	7/10	8/10

Both Hostile Territory and Warzones received "generally favorable reviews" according to the review aggregation website Metacritic. Jim Preston of NextGen called the former "A small improvement over the original that also smartly retains all the fun."

The D-Pad Destroyer of GamePro said of Hostile Territory, "If you were a fan of the original, you'll probably love Smuggler's Run 2. It's less a sequel and more like what the original should have been. If you couldn't be bothered with Smuggler's Run, this version doesn't really add too much---just leave it in the dirt and go on to the next pick-up." (Note: GamePro gave the PlayStation 2 version 4/5 for graphics, 3/5 for sound, and two 3.5/5 scores for control and fun factor.) Much later, Four-Eyed Dragon said, "Despite its questionable ethical objectives, Warzones is simply a frantic driver that has you racing from one point to another while trying to avoid the local law." (Note: GamePro gave the GameCube version three 4.5/5 scores for graphics, control, and fun factor, and 4/5 for sound.)

The latter was nominated for the "Best Driving Game on GameCube" award at GameSpot's Best and Worst of 2002 Awards, which went to NASCAR: Dirt to Daytona.
