= Crusaders (novel) =

First edition (publ. Faber & Faber)

Crusaders is a novel by the British author Richard T. Kelly published in 2008.

== Plot summary ==
Crusaders is set mainly in Newcastle upon Tyne in the year 1996, although there are scenes set in earlier years, and an epilogue set just before the 1997 General Election.

The principal character of the novel is the Reverend John Gore, a 31-year old Church of England vicar who returns to his native north-east in order to start a new church in the run-down (fictional) area of Hoxheath. Gore is a supporter of the Labour Party, although both his father and his sister, Susannah, a PR consultant, vote Conservative. Gore renews an acquaintanceship with Dr Martin Pallister, a former lecturer and left-wing firebrand who, encouraged by Susannah, has become an ambitious New Labour MP. Another old acquaintance is Simon Barlow, an evangelical vicar whose parish is in a more affluent part of Newcastle but who offers to help Gore.

After Gore makes an impression in the local media, Pallister offers him the chance to become involved in an urban regeneration scheme, but Gore is suspicious of the scheme and of Pallister's motives. Pallister begins to work with Barlow, who is evidently trying to discredit Gore.

Gore becomes the lover of Lindy Clark, a single mother from Hoxheath, and accepts the support of Steve Coulson, a local hard man and ‘security consultant’ who works for a dubious businessman by the name of Roy Caldwell. Prompted by Caldwell, Coulson carries out the shooting of two rival gangsters in a restaurant before hiding the murder weapon at Lindy's home. Gore is uneasy about Coulson, but discovers that Coulson is the father of Lindy's son, Jake, as well as her employer. Gore visits the club where Lindy works and becomes involved in an altercation with some of Coulson's associates, one of whom, Robbie, reveals to Gore that he is an undercover police officer.

Gore gives shelter to Mackers, a young assistant of Coulson who is suspected of talking to the police about the shootings. After spending the evening at Lindy's home, Gore is angered when she is summoned to the nightclub by Coulson. The couple argue, and Gore discovers the gun used by Coulson in the killings. Later, he confronts Robbie outside the club and tells Robbie he has important information about Coulson. Robbie is skeptical but gives Robbie a contact number.

Gore discovers that Lindy also works as a cleaner and receptionist at a massage parlour owned by Caldwell. He visits the premises and eventually persuades Lindy to leave but is confronted by Shack, one of Coulson's henchmen. Shack allows Gore and Lindy to leave, but contacts Coulson. At Lindy's, Gore relocates the gun and contacts Robbie. Coulson arrives and gives Gore a severe beating, but the house is attacked by a group of men, seemingly led by Shack, who stab Coulson to death – possibly on the orders of Caldwell. Robbie and the police arrive shortly afterwards, and Gore is taken to hospital.

Some time later, it transpires that Lindy loses custody of Jake, despite Gore pleading her case. Just before the 1997 General Election, Gore appears in Durham as a campaign manager for the Labour Party, having evidently lost his position in Hoxheath. He works alongside Pallister, who has maintained a relationship with Susannah.
