= Couzin Ed =

American radio personality

- Born: Michael Andrews; 1968 (age 56–57); Washington D.C.
- Occupation(s): Bar manager, official on-field announcer, air personality, former radio disc jockey
- Website: http://www.couzined.com

Couzin Ed (real name Michael Andrews, born 1968) is an American bar manager and former radio disc jockey who resides in Philadelphia, Pennsylvania. In 2002 he received a Billboard/Airplay Monitor Radio Award as local air personality of the year at a mainstream rock station.

== Career ==
Couzin Ed has been successfully syndicated in numerous markets. He was part of WDRE, Y100, as well as WYSP in Philadelphia. He began his radio career in Norfolk, Virginia. He has interviewed hundreds of bands, celebrities, athletes, and appears on several DVDs, including the recent Woodstock concerts that erupted in a riot. He hosted the international radio and Pay-per-view TV broadcast from the event.

Couzin Ed also works for Rockstar Games in New York City as their Event Host & Coordinator directing voice talent, radio promotions, and he has done voice work for the popular Grand Theft Auto video game series, of which Lazlow is the executive music producer and writer. In Grand Theft Auto: Vice City Stories, Couzin Ed is the DJ for V-Rock, and Lazlow is his intern. Couzin Ed's work for Rockstar Games also includes promoting their product by doing guest appearances on radio stations nationwide. In addition, he is a semi-regular guest on the former bi-monthly Lazlow Show on XM Satellite Radio channel XM202 in New York City, out of the XM Radio studios at the Opie and Anthony broadcast center which aired every other month on Saturday nights before being canceled after the Sirius Satellite Radio and XM Radio merger. Couzin Ed is the Philadelphia Eagles official on-field announcer during home games at Lincoln Financial Field.

== Life ==
Couzin Ed was born in Washington, D.C. in 1968. He graduated Old Dominion University in 1993. He married on October 5, 2007; and he and his wife reside in the Old City section of Philadelphia.
