= Sam Houser =

English video game producer (born 1971)

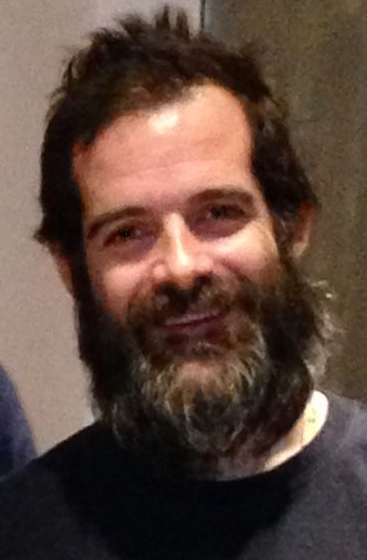
- Houser in the mid-2010s
- Born: Samuel Houser; November 1971 (age 54–55); London, England
- Citizenship: United Kingdom; United States (since 2007)
- Education: University of London; University of Cambridge
- Occupation: Video game producer
- Years active: 1996–present
- Spouse: Anouchka Houser
- Mother: Geraldine Moffat
- Family: Dan Houser (brother)

Samuel Houser (born November 1971) is an English video game producer. He is a co-founder and the current president of Rockstar Games, and is one of the creative driving forces behind the Grand Theft Auto franchise, having been its producer since the third game. His brother Dan was Rockstar's vice president of creativity until 2020.

== Early life ==
Samuel Houser was born in London in November 1971, the son of actress Geraldine Moffat and solicitor Walter Houser. His younger brother, Dan Houser, co-founded Rockstar Games with him. He was educated at St Paul's School, the University of London, and the University of Cambridge. He drew inspiration from crime films at an early age because his mother often appeared in that genre. As a child, The Getaway briefly inspired him to become a bank robber. Games like Elite and Mr. Do! were his favourite games growing up, with the former allowing him to explore his "bad boy" side at an early age.

== Career ==
Houser joined Bertelsmann Music Group in 1990, working in the company's post room. In 1994, he was named to BMG's new interactive entertainment division. By 1996, Houser became Head of Development at BMG Interactive.

Houser became a video producer for BMG Interactive after he and his father had lunch with the executive producer of the music label, who claimed that Houser had some good ideas. After BMG partnered with a small CD ROM company, Houser transferred to the Interactive Publishing division of BMG in order to work closely with developing video games.

Credited as executive producer, Houser is also the creator of several of the games in the Grand Theft Auto series with his brother Dan. On Grand Theft Auto III, his responsibilities were, in his words, to be "militant on ensuring the game had a look, a sound, a story and a feel that worked". His description of the series as a whole is that the three sixth-generation Grand Theft Auto games form a "trilogy, [featuring] our distorted look at the East Coast around the time of the millennium (Grand Theft Auto III), followed by our reinterpretation of '80s Miami (Vice City), and lastly, our look at early-'90s California (San Andreas)".

Despite their status as the creators of Grand Theft Auto, one of the most successful video game franchises of all time, Houser and his brother both prefer to avoid the media spotlight and instead focus on the Rockstar Games brand rather than any one person getting the credit for the games' success. In 2009, both brothers appeared in Time magazine's 100 most influential people of 2009 list. Houser also produced Max Payne 3 and Grand Theft Auto V.

Houser was inducted into the Academy of Interactive Arts & Sciences' Hall of Fame in 2014. He was portrayed by Daniel Radcliffe in the 2015 television film The Gamechangers.

In May 2025, Houser and his brother were listed in the Sunday Times Rich List with an estimated net worth of £400 million.

== Personal life ==
Houser and his wife Anouchka married by 2005 and had children. Houser holds both British and American citizenship, having acquired the latter in 2007. He lives in the Brooklyn borough of New York City. As of 2016, Houser and his wife were directors of the Houser Foundation Inc. in New York, alongside Dan and his wife Krystyna.

== Works ==
=== Executive producer ===
- Grand Theft Auto (1997)
- Body Harvest (1998)
- Space Station Silicon Valley (1998)
- Grand Theft Auto: London 1969 (1999)
- Grand Theft Auto 2 (1999)
- Grand Theft Auto III (2001)
- Grand Theft Auto: Vice City (2002)
- Manhunt (2003)
- Grand Theft Auto: San Andreas (2004)
- Grand Theft Auto: Liberty City Stories (2005)
- The Warriors (2005)
- Grand Theft Auto: Vice City Stories (2006)
- Bully (2006)
- Manhunt 2 (2007)
- Grand Theft Auto IV (2008)
- Grand Theft Auto: The Lost and Damned (2009)
- Grand Theft Auto: The Ballad of Gay Tony (2009)
- Red Dead Redemption (2010)
- L.A. Noire (2011)
- Max Payne 3 (2012)
- Grand Theft Auto V (2013)
- Red Dead Redemption 2 (2018)
- Grand Theft Auto VI (2026)

=== Voice actor ===
- Grand Theft Auto III (2001) – AmmuNation Clerk
- Grand Theft Auto: San Andreas (2004) – Gangster (credited)
- Grand Theft Auto IV (2008)

== Sources ==
- Kushner, David (2012). Jacked: The Outlaw Story of Grand Theft Auto. Haboken, New Jersey: John Wiley & Sons, Inc. ISBN 978-0-470-93637-5.
