= The Knives =

2016 novel by Richard T Kelly

- First edition
- Author: Richard T. Kelly
- Language: English
- Published: September 27, 2016
- Publisher: Faber & Faber
- Pages: 304
- ISBN: 978-0571296668

The Knives is a 2016 British political thriller by Richard T. Kelly. The novel deals with fictional Home Secretary David Blaylock, a member of the Tory Party who tries to navigate the crisis of growing anti-immigrant sentiment in the U.K.

Kelly began writing the novel in 2009 under the title Homeland which he eventually changed after the successful American T.V. show of the same name premiered in 2011.

== Plot ==
In 2010 ex-soldier David Baylock, a member of the Tory Party, struggles to juggle his political life.

== Reception ==
The Knives received positive reviews upon its release. The Guardian called it "the best novel about modern politics I have read in years". The Financial Times described it as "a sharp and engaging tale".
