= Eric Corley =

American magazine publisher and hacker (born 1959)

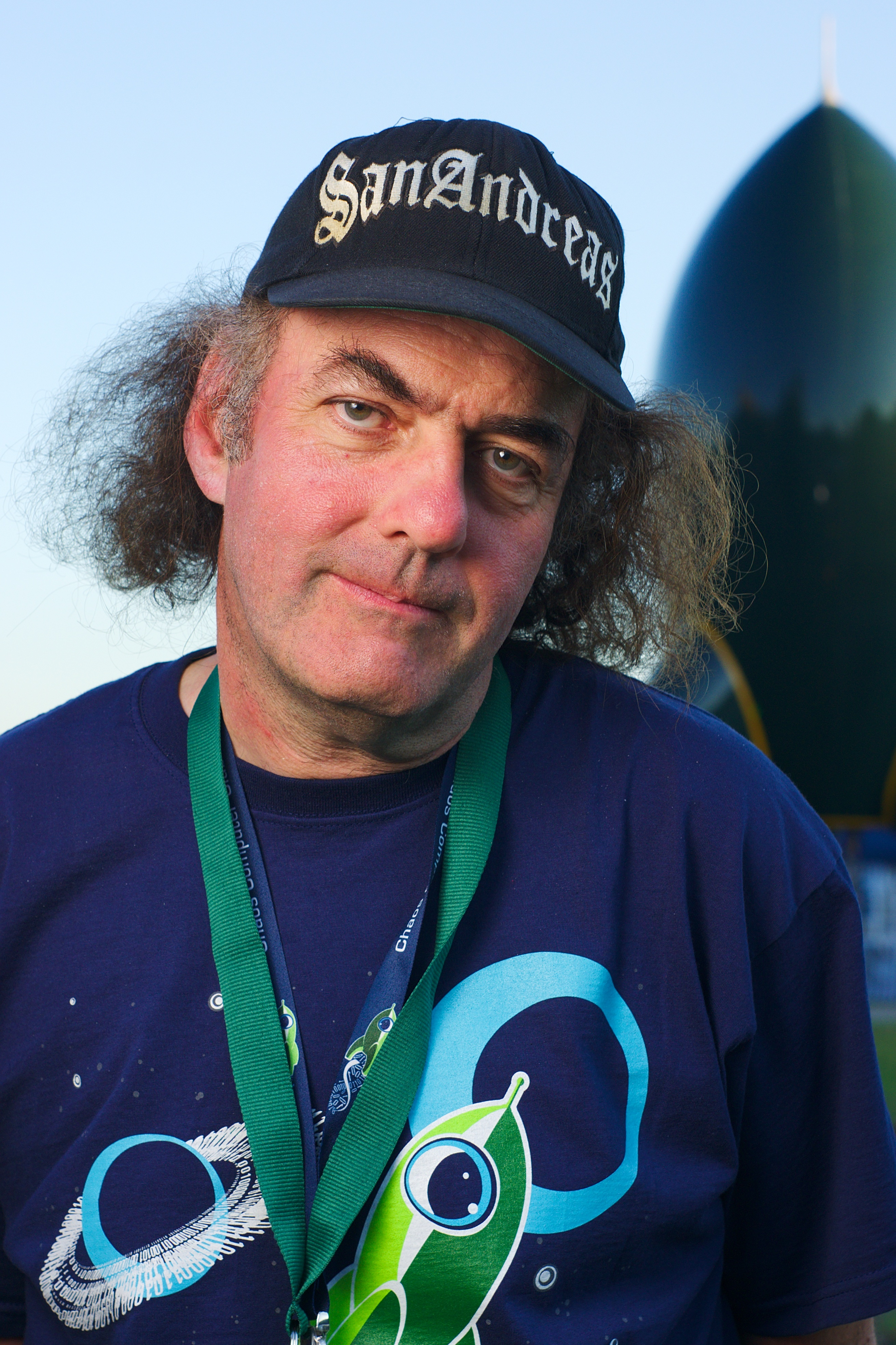
- Corley at Chaos Communication Camp in 2011
- Born: Eric Gordon Corley; December 16, 1959 (age 66); Suffolk County, New York
- Education: Stony Brook University English
- Occupations: Writer, editor, publisher, talk show host, voice actor, film director
- Writing career
- Pen name: Emmanuel Goldstein
- Notable works: 2600 Magazine, Dear Hacker, The Best of 2600: A Hacker Odyssey
- Website: www.2600.com

Eric Gordon Corley (born December 16, 1959), also frequently referred to by his pen name of Emmanuel Goldstein, is a figure in the hacker community. He directs the non-profit organization 2600 Enterprises, Inc., publishes a magazine called 2600: The Hacker Quarterly (which has associated monthly meet-ups around the world), and hosts the hacker convention Hackers on Planet Earth (HOPE). His pseudonym is derived from the fictional opposition leader in George Orwell's dystopian novel Nineteen Eighty-Four.

In 1993, Corley testified before the United States House of Representatives Subcommittee on Telecommunications. Corley was questioned in relation to the content of 2600 as part of discussions concerning the Digital Telephony Bill; also known as the Communications Assistance for Law Enforcement Act.

Corley is the editor of The Best of 2600: A Hacker Odyssey which was released July 2008. The book consists of articles from the magazine 2600: The Hacker Quarterly set in chronological order to show the evolution of the internet and technology. A follow-up book, Dear Hacker. Letters to the Editor of 2600, was published in 2010.

Corley is the host of both the weekly radio programs Off the Hook on WBAI-FM and Off the Wall on WUSB-FM. While Off the Hook often includes a panel of guests and is frequently centered on technological topics, Off the Wall is usually narrated by Eric Corley himself and has covered a wide range of topics. Off the Hook has been on the air since 1988.

== Filmography ==
Corley directed the 2001 film Freedom Downtime, a documentary about the incarcerations of Kevin Mitnick and Bernie S that also examines alleged distortions in mainstream media coverage of Mitnick's case.
