= Off the Hook (radio program) =

- Genre: Talk radio, current affairs
- Running time: 60 min.
- Country of origin: United States
- Language: English
- Home station: WBAI
- Hosted by: Emmanuel Goldstein
- Starring: Various panelists
- Created by: Emmanuel Goldstein
- Recording studio: New York City, New York
- Original release: 1988 – present
- Audio format: Stereophonic
- Opening theme: "Much Worse" (Extended Mix) by Big Audio Dynamite
- Website: www.2600.com/offthehook/
- Podcast: high-fidelity feed

Off the Hook is a hacker-oriented weekly talk radio program, hosted by Emmanuel Goldstein, which focuses on the societal ramifications of information technology and the laws that regulate how people use them. It airs Wednesday nights at 7:00 p.m. Eastern Time in New York City on the community radio station WBAI 99.5 FM. It is also simulcast online via streaming MP3, rebroadcast on various other radio stations, and has been made available as a podcast (since long before that term was coined).

== History ==
=== Premiere ===
Off the Hook first aired on Thursday, October 7, 1988. It was originally set to debut Friday, August 12, 1988, but a fire on the radio transmitter floor of the Empire State Building forced a postponement.

=== Notable events ===
Some notable events in the program's history include:

- On November 30, 1999, journalist Amy Goodman reported live from the World Trade Organization protests, while being repeatedly approached by police and tear-gassed.
- As an April Fool's Day prank in 2008, the crew faked a hack on Barack Obama's campaign website.
- As an April Fool's Day prank in 2009, the show staged a mock shutdown and takeover of WBAI by a new country station. Rather than the show's intro, the hour opened with an apparent station sign-off followed by the introduction of "New York's New Radio Station," playing a "10,000 song marathon" to celebrate the birth of "Country 99.5". For 17 minutes WBAI broadcast to the Greater New York area as a country station.

=== Possible Conclusion ===
On November 13, 2012, it was announced that "Off the Hook" was possibly facing conclusion due to "2600"'s frustration with WBAI, as well as difficulty accessing the studio and its resources in the wake of Hurricane Sandy. However, new episodes have continued airing over WBAI.

== Show format ==
After a quick presentation of the panelist(s) or on-air guest(s), the radio show normally starts with a report and discussion of the previous week's most interesting hacker, technology, and activist related news. Sometimes, it also features an interview with external guests.

=== Listener contributions ===
Toward the end of the program, Goldstein often reads listener e-mails and/or takes listener phone calls, time providing.

Listener calls vary from people commenting and asking questions about previously discussed topics to reporting their own news. Calls are taken in an unfiltered fashion, with callers being selected at random and immediately put on-air (although there is a seven-second delay). The show does not utilize a producer to screen for 'valid' calls before bringing them on-air. As such, it's not uncommon for callers to speak off topic, or seek help for a computer-related problem, possibly mistaking Off the Hook for the subsequent radio program on WBAI, The Personal Computer Show. It is also not uncommon for calls to be dropped, or for callers to hang up, much to the consternation of the show's hosts.

Since the show has an international audience, due to its streamed web presence and coverage of topics often of international interest, callers come from many countries in addition to the US.

== Personalities ==
Many individuals, from across the hacker, activist, computer security, etc. communities, have played active roles in or appeared on the show over the years.

Emmanuel Goldstein has regularly hosted the show since its inception.

The show's current lineup:
- Alexander Urbelis
- Bernie S
- Gila Hava Drazen
- Kyle
- Rob Vincent, a.k.a. "Rob T Firefly"
- volt4ire

Past regular panelists:
- Alexander Urbelis
- Arseny
- Gus
- Izaac Falken
- Jim Vichench, a.k.a. "Red Balaclava"
- Juintz
- Leo
- Mark Abene, a.k.a. "Phiber Optik"
- Mike Castleman
- notKevin
- Redbird
- Redhackt
- [dot]Ret

Other occasional returning and notable one-time guests:
- Bicyclemark
- Birgitta Jónsdóttir
- Bre Pettis
- Dan Kaminsky
- Julian Assange
- KRT_
- Kevin Mitnick
- Lazlow Jones
- LexIcon
- Mitch Altman
- Negativland
- Dave Buchwald
- RenderMan
- Rop Gonggrijp
- Steven Rambam
- Tiffany Rad
- The Yes Men

== See also ==
- 2600
- Gonzo journalism
- Hackers on Planet Earth (HOPE) conference
- Hacker (programmer subculture)
- Hactivism
- Phreaking
