= The Possessions of Doctor Forrest =

- First edition (publ. Faber & Faber)
- Author: Richard T. Kelly
- Language: English
- Publisher: Faber & Faber
- Publication date: 2011
- LC Class: PR6111.E5235 P67

The Possessions of Doctor Forrest is a 2011 contemporary thriller novel with a gothic style by British novelist Richard T. Kelly.

Kelly deliberately uses gothic motifs and styles, with seven narrators each communicating in different styles appropriate to the genre. Multiple critics note that this tribute works with mixed degrees of success.

== Reception ==
Reception of the novel is consistently mixed. When writing for The Independent, Kevin Jackson describes the novel as "a book which has the robust narrative drive of genre fiction but also the thoughtfulness and stylistic flair of good literary fiction." While reviewing the novel for The Guardian, critic Toby Litt describe the novel as not fully fulfilling its potential as a modern novel, calling it a familiar "yarn about making a dodgy deal with the devil, a fast-paced pitch-black romp through some familiar spooky locations and situations". Writing for the Financial Times, describes the book not living up when compared to the intertextually referenced gothic works it reflects like Strange Case of Dr Jekyll and Mr Hyde.
