= Bernie S =

American hacker

Bernie S. (born Edward Cummings) is a computer hacker living in Philadelphia, Pennsylvania. He was a regular panelist on the WBAI radio show Off the Hook. In 2001 he appeared in Freedom Downtime, a documentary produced by 2600 Films.

== Confiscation ==
In 1995, the police department of Haverford Township, Pennsylvania happened upon what they believed to be a drug transaction. However, upon looking closer, they discovered Bernie and others were actually buying and selling crystals used in crystal radio and other technological applications. The police who responded were not knowledgeable about technology or computers, which led them to confiscate all the crystals as suspicious materials along with some reading material such as The Whole Spy Catalog.

After the United States Secret Service inquired about the seized equipment, Special Agent Thomas Varney informed local police that some of the equipment was for illicit purposes only. Bernie was subsequently arrested and charged with possession of a non-working RadioShack red box tone phone dialer. Additional materials were seized and never returned.

== Criminal complaint ==
Charges were filed against Edward E. Cummings (case number 95-320) in the United States District Court for the Eastern District of Pennsylvania. The charges were for the possession of a speed dialer, an IBM Thinkpad laptop, and computer discs which could be used for unauthorized telecommunications access. The Grand Jury convened on March 13, 1995, and Bernie S's trial was scheduled for September 8, 1995. Varney labeled Bernie S a danger to society for having too much information, due to the publishing by 2600 Films and Bernie S of Secret Service offices' locations, phone numbers, and radio frequencies, along with photos and codes.

== Imprisonment ==
On September 7, 1995, Bernie S. pleaded guilty to possession of technology which could be used in a fraudulent manner. He was released on October 13, 1995. In January 1996, he was arrested for tampering with evidence, a violation of the conditions set for his probation. In March 1996, he received a sentence of 6 to 24 months.

While awaiting a parole hearing, he was charged by Bucks County, Pennsylvania prison officials with misuse of the telephone system when he received a call from Rob Bernstein, a reporter for Internet Underground. The charges could have added as much as nine months to his sentence. Bernie S. appealed the decision, and he filed a grievance for harassment and intimidation against the prison. While awaiting his release on parole, he was moved to a high-security facility, where he was attacked by a fellow inmate and suffered a broken arm and jaw.

After a letter writing campaign, a telephone campaign, and a physical demonstration outside the prison where he was housed, on September 13, 1996 Bernie S. was released on parole.
