= IAsiaWorks =

American communications company

iAsiaWorks
- Company type: Public
- Traded as: NASDAQ: IAWK
- Industry: Internet service provider, Internet data center
- Founded: 2000
- Defunct: 2001
- Fate: Acquired
- Headquarters: Hong Kong, Taipei, Seoul
- Key people: Jon Beizer (CEO), Jon Engman (CFO), Nick Levay (CSO)
- Services: ISP, Datacenter services

iAsiaWorks was an ISP and Internet data center (IDC) from 2000–2001 during the final days of the dot-com era, which built state-of-the-art data centers in Hong Kong, Taipei, Seoul and other cities. Its IPO on the NASDAQ was IAWK on Aug 19th, 2000.

== Officers ==
- CEO: Jon Beizer
- CFO: Jon Engman
- CSO: Nick Levay

== Description ==
iAsiaWorks began as a Taiwan & Korean ISP called AUNet, raised additional capital, and purchased AT&T's Hong Kong ISP business in early 2000. The newly merged company offered leased line and datacenter space to companies across Asia Pacific, but with a particular focus on Taiwan, Hong Kong, and South Korea. In each of these markets it built 100,000-square-foot (9,300 m^{2}) datacenter facilities, which remained mostly empty until it closed in mid to late 2001. The facilities were built to the highest specifications available in Asia. In the fall of 2001 iAsiaWork's facility in Seoul was purchased by Dacom where it consolidated its 'KIDC' operations. Its former facility in Hong Kong was occupied by Singtel. The status of the facility in Taiwan remains unknown.
