= Richard T. Kelly =

British novelist (born 1970)

Richard T. Kelly (born 1970) is a British novelist and writer best known for his 2016 political thriller The Knives.

== Career ==
Kelly began his career writing in film and wrote several film-related books. In 1998 he wrote Alan Clarke, a book on the filmmaker Alan Clarke. In 2000 he published The Name of this Book is Dogme 95, a look at the Danish film movement Dogme 95 created by Lars von Trier and Thomas Vinterberg. In 2004 he wrote an authorized biography of actor Sean Penn called Sean Penn: His Life & Times.

Kelly made his fictional debut with the 2008 novel Crusaders. Shortly after, in 2009, he began research on a political thriller that would develop into The Knives. His second novel The Possessions of Doctor Forrest followed in 2011. The Knives was published in 2016.

Since 2008 Kelly has been a Contributing Editor and feature writer for the UK edition of Esquire magazine.

== Bibliography ==
- Alan Clarke (1998)
- The Name of this Book is Dogme 95 (2000)
- Sean Penn: His Life & Times (2004)
- Ten Bad Dates with De Niro: A Book of Alternative Movie Lists (2007) (editor)
- Crusaders (2008)
- The Possessions of Doctor Forrest (2011)
- Our House, Your Home: The Past, Present and Future of Social Housing (2014)
- The Knives (2016)
- Keegan and Dalglish (2017)
