= WUSB (FM) =

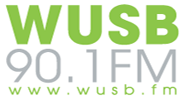
- Stony Brook, New York; United States
- Broadcast area: Suffolk County, New York
- Frequency: 90.1 MHz

Programming
- Language: English
- Format: Variety
- Affiliations: Pacifica Radio Network

Ownership
- Owner: State University of New York

History
- First air date: June 27, 1977
- Call sign meaning: University of Stony Brook

Technical information
- Licensing authority: FCC
- Facility ID: 63110
- Class: B1
- ERP: 3,600 watts
- HAAT: 162 meters (531 ft)
- Transmitter coordinates: 40°50′32″N 73°02′23″W
- Translator: 107.3 W297BM (Stony Brook)

Links
- Public license information: Public file; LMS
- Webcast: Listen live (128 kbps); Listen live (64 kbps)
- Website: www.wusb.fm

WUSB (90.1 MHz) is a non-commercial radio station licensed by the Federal Communications Commission (FCC) to Stony Brook, New York. The station is owned by the State University of New York, with studios located on the second floor of Stony Brook University's West Side Dining facility, and its transmitter is located in Farmingville, New York. WUSB is a free-form radio station, staffed by more than 150 volunteers who devote their time and energy for the love of music and free-form radio. The station is partially listener-supported.

== History ==
The station began in 1962 as a carrier current station, broadcasting only within the confines of the then-new Stony Brook campus on 820 kHz on the AM band. The station was, at the time, an integral part of Stony Brook University's once-lively concert scene, which brought such bands and acts as Simon and Garfunkel, Thelonious Monk, The Grateful Dead (in their first-ever East Coast concert appearance), Jimi Hendrix, The Doors, Jefferson Airplane, Arlo Guthrie, Joni Mitchell, Janis Joplin, the Allman Brothers Band, Pink Floyd, Van Morrison, The Who, Jethro Tull, Cat Stevens, Hot Tuna, Santana, Stony Brook's own Blue Öyster Cult, the Beach Boys, Frank Zappa, Billy Joel, Bob Marley and the Wailers, Jerry Garcia and more. Many of these musicians paid a visit to the station as well. In its earliest days, the studios were located in a "hole in the ground" in the Pritchard Gymnasium, before relocating to another cramped space in the basement of one of the dormitories, James College. One of the station's broadcasters, Paul (the Bean) Kornreich, was not only one of the station's DJ's but also its first basketball announcer. In 1975, the studios then moved to the Student Union, Room 240, where they remained until they moved to the second floor of the West Side Dining facility on January 27, 2017.

In 1965, New York mandated that all of its campus radio stations across the state make the transition to FM, as part of its master plan for the university system. Since it was up to each individual school to obtain a license on its own, WUSB began a long battle to get a spot on the increasingly crowded FM dial. Efforts to get the station on FM began in 1970, originally with an attempt to purchase a plot of land near campus to build a transmitter. New York regulations, however, prevented that from happening. Ultimately, construction began on a tower atop the Graduate Chemistry building, which, at the time, was the tallest building on the Stony Brook campus, and approval for the construction of the new station was received from the Board of Trustees in 1973.

However, WUSB's construction permit was challenged by Adelphi University, whose station, WBAU, which at the time broadcast on the first-adjacent frequency, 90.3, out of Garden City on Long Island (but which is no longer on the air), objected to the proposed station, citing potential interference to their signal. However, the FCC overruled WBAU's objections in 1976, and granted WUSB a license to begin broadcasting in 1977.

At the time, WUSB was Long Island's most powerful non-commercial radio station, putting out 4,000 watts of power, primarily covering central Suffolk County. The station signed on as an FM station for the first time on June 27, 1977, at 5:30 in the afternoon.

The station's first general manager was Norm Prusslin, a University alumnus, employee, adjunct professor and advisor. He held this position continuously until his retirement in early 2006. He was later succeeded as general manager by Isobel Breheny Schafer. Many of the station's original volunteers, including its Chief Engineer, Frank Burgert, were students in 1977. Many alumni of Stony Brook remain to this day as WUSB volunteers. Rich Koch was the station's first program director when the station began broadcasting on FM and he also remains as an active WUSB staffer.

The initial location of WUSB's antenna provided excellent coverage to the campus and much of Long Island's north shore, but the high wattage of the station began to have adverse effects on experiments conducted in laboratories of the Chemistry building, as well as those in the nearby Physics building. In the mid-1980s, it was determined that, to eliminate interference, the antenna would either have to be moved or have its power drastically reduced. It was decided to move the antenna to a new off-campus location.

After many potential locations were examined across Suffolk County, an agreement was reached with the owners of a new tower being constructed at Bald Hill in Farmingville, New York, one of the highest points on Long Island. WBLI had already signed on as a tenant on the new tower, and WUSB leased space there as well. However, objections were raised again, with first-adjacent stations broadcasting on 89.9 and 90.3 FM on Long Island. WUSB ultimately was able to successfully overcome these objections, and since November 1995, has broadcast from atop the "Mile High" tower at Farmingville. The move also resulted in WUSB increasing its geographic coverage of Long Island (within its primary and secondary signal contours) by close to 100%, despite the fact that power was lowered to 3,600 watts as part of the move. An unfortunate byproduct of the move was that reception on campus worsened, due to local topography and structures creating partial barriers between the University and Bald Hill.

During normal operations, WUSB's audio signal is sent from its studios to the transmitter site via a T1 line. However, the old antenna location, atop the Graduate Chemistry building, remains as an emergency alternative to the Farmingville transmitter site, as well as an emergency studio-transmitter link to the Farmingville tower.

WUSB has traditionally been funded by students through the Undergraduate Student Government (formerly known as Polity). Since 1989, WUSB has held annual radiothons (originally once per year, now twice per year, in the fall and spring) to raise money from listeners to pay for the station's operating expenses. Much of the money raised goes to pay for the station's transmitter lease and fixed operating expenses.

=== Translator ===
In 2003, WUSB applied for a translator. If approved by the FCC, it would have allowed the station to rebroadcast its signal on 98.3 FM on the North Shore. It would also improve the signal in other areas, such as the main campus, where there are dead spots or interference from other stations. This application was dismissed in 2013. The station applied for another translator to broadcast on 107.3 FM and received a construction permit from the FCC in 2013. license to cover was accepted on January 6, 2017.

== Notable alumni ==
- Eric Corley, editor and founder of 2600 Magazine
- Sam Taylor, blues and jazz musician

== Radio training ==
Each fall and spring, WUSB holds a radio training class, open to all residents of the community as well as University students, who are interested in learning more about radio and broadcasting, and offering the opportunity for interested individuals to become volunteer staff at the station, upon successful completion of training and approval of the Program Director. On occasion, a training class is also offered by the station during the summer months.
