= VMware Carbon Black =

U.S.-based cybersecurity company

- Formerly: Bit9; Bit9 + Carbon Black; Carbon Black
- Company type: Subsidiary
- Industry: Endpoint security
- Founded: 2002; 24 years ago (as Bit9)
- Founders: Todd Brennan; Allen Hillery; John Hanratty
- Headquarters: Waltham, Massachusetts, U.S.
- Key people: Patrick Morley, CEO
- Products: Security software
- Number of employees: 1000+ (2019)
- Parent: VMware
- Website: carbonblack.com

VMware Carbon Black (formerly Bit9, Bit9 + Carbon Black, and Carbon Black) is a cybersecurity company based in Waltham, Massachusetts. The company develops cloud-native endpoint security software that is designed to detect malicious behavior and to help prevent malicious files from attacking an organization. The company leverages technology known as the Carbon Black Cloud (CBC), a big data and analytics cloud platform that analyzes customers’ unfiltered data for threats.

The company has approximately 100 partners. It has over 5,600 customers including approximately one-third of the Fortune 100.

In October 2019, the company was acquired by VMware.

== History ==
Carbon Black was founded as Bit9 in 2002 by Todd Brennan, Allen Hillery, and John Hanratty. The company's first CEO was George Kassabgi. In 2007, Patrick Morley, the former chief operating officer of Corel, took over as CEO.

In 2013, the company's network was broken into by malicious actors who copied a private signing key for a certificate and used it to sign malware.

In February 2014, Bit9 acquired start-up security firm Carbon Black. At the time of the acquisition, the company also raised $38.25 million in Series E funding, bringing Bit9’s total venture capital raised to approximately $120 million. The company acquired Objective Logistics in June 2015. In August 2015, the company announced that it had acquired data analytics firm Visitrend and would open a technology development center in downtown Boston. A month later, the company announced it would partner with SecureWorks, Ernst & Young, Kroll, Trustwave, and Rapid7 to provide managed security and incident response services.

The company changed its name to Carbon Black on February 1, 2016, after being known as "Bit9 + Carbon Black" for approximately two years.

In July 2016, Carbon Black announced it had acquired next-generation antivirus software provider Confer for an undisclosed sum. Prior to the deal, Confer had raised $25 million in venture funding and had more than 50 employees. According to The Wall Street Journal, the deal was valued at $100 million.

On May 4, 2018, the company joined public markets, listing as "CBLK" on the Nasdaq exchange. As part of its initial public offering (IPO), Carbon Black raised approximately $152 million at a valuation of $1.25 billion. Prior to its IPO, the firm had raised $190M from investors including Kleiner Perkins, Highland Capital, Sequoia, Accomplice, and Blackstone.

In October 2019, the company was acquired by VMware for $2.1 billion.

On November 22, 2023, Broadcom Inc. acquired VMware in a cash-and-stock transaction valued at US$69 billion.

In March of 2024, Broadcom merged its existing Symantec security assets with Carbon Black assets to form the Enterprise Security Group.
