= PhreakNIC =

PhreakNIC is an annual hacker and technology convention held in middle Tennessee. It is organized by the Nashville 2600 Organization and draws upon resources from SouthEastern 2600 (se2600). The Nashville Linux User Group was closely tied with PhreakNIC for the first 10 years, but is no longer an active participant in the planning. First held in 1997, PhreakNIC continues to be a long-time favorite among hackers, security experts and technology enthusiasts. PhreakNIC currently holds claim as the oldest regional hacker con and is one of the few hacker cons run by a 501(c)(3) tax-free charity. The conference has attracted as many as 350 attendees in the past.

PhreakNIC consists of presentations on a variety of technical subjects, sometimes related to a conference theme. There are also usually activities such as a CTF and locksport. The Nashville Linux Users Group held a Linux Installfest from PhreakNIC 3 through PhreakNIC X. A small programming track for kids aged 8–14 included some coding and sometime soldering at PhreakNIC 19 through PhreakNIC 22.

PhreakNIC is attended by hackers and other technology enthusiasts from across the United States, although, as a regional conference, most of its attendees come from a two-state radius around Tennessee, including groups from Missouri, Ohio, Washington, DC, Georgia, Kentucky, and Alabama.

== Past locations ==
- Drury Inn at I-24 and Harding Place
  - PhreakNIC 2
  - PhreakNIC 3: October 29–31, 1999
- Days Inn on Briley Pkwy at the airport
  - PhreakNIC 4: November 3–5, 2000
  - PhreakNIC 5: November 2–4, 2001
- Ramada Inn downtown
  - PhreakNIC 6: November 1–3, 2002
- Days Inn at the Stadium
  - PhreakNIC 7: October 24–26, 2003
  - PhreakNIC 8: October 22–24, 2004
  - PhreakNIC 9: October 21–23, 2005
  - PhreakNIC 10: October 20–22, 2006
  - PhreakNIC 11: October 19–21, 2007
  - PhreakNIC 12: October 24–26, 2008
  - PhreakNIC 13: October 30–31, 2009
  - PhreakNIC 14: October 15–17, 2010
  - PhreakNIC 15: November 4–6, 2011
- Clarion Inn and Suites, Murfreesboro, TN
  - PhreakNIC 16: November 9–11, 2012
  - PhreakNIC 17: September 20–22, 2013
- Millennium Maxwell House Hotel, Nashville, TN
  - PhreakNIC 18: October 30 - November 2, 2014
- Clarion Inn and Suites, Murfreesboro, TN
  - PhreakNIC 19: November 6–7, 2015
  - PhreakNIC 20: November 4–6, 2016
  - PhreakNIC 21: November 3-5, 2017
  - PhreakNIC 22: October 19-20, 2018
  - PhreakNIC 23: November 8-10, 2019
  - PhreakNIC 24: November 3-5, 2023
  - PhreakNIC 25: November 8-9, 2024
  - PhreakNIC 26: November 14-15, 2025

== See also ==
- DEF CON
- Hackers on Planet Earth
- Notacon
- Shmoocon
- CarolinaCon
