= Hackers on Planet Earth =

Conference series

HOPE (Hackers On Planet Earth)
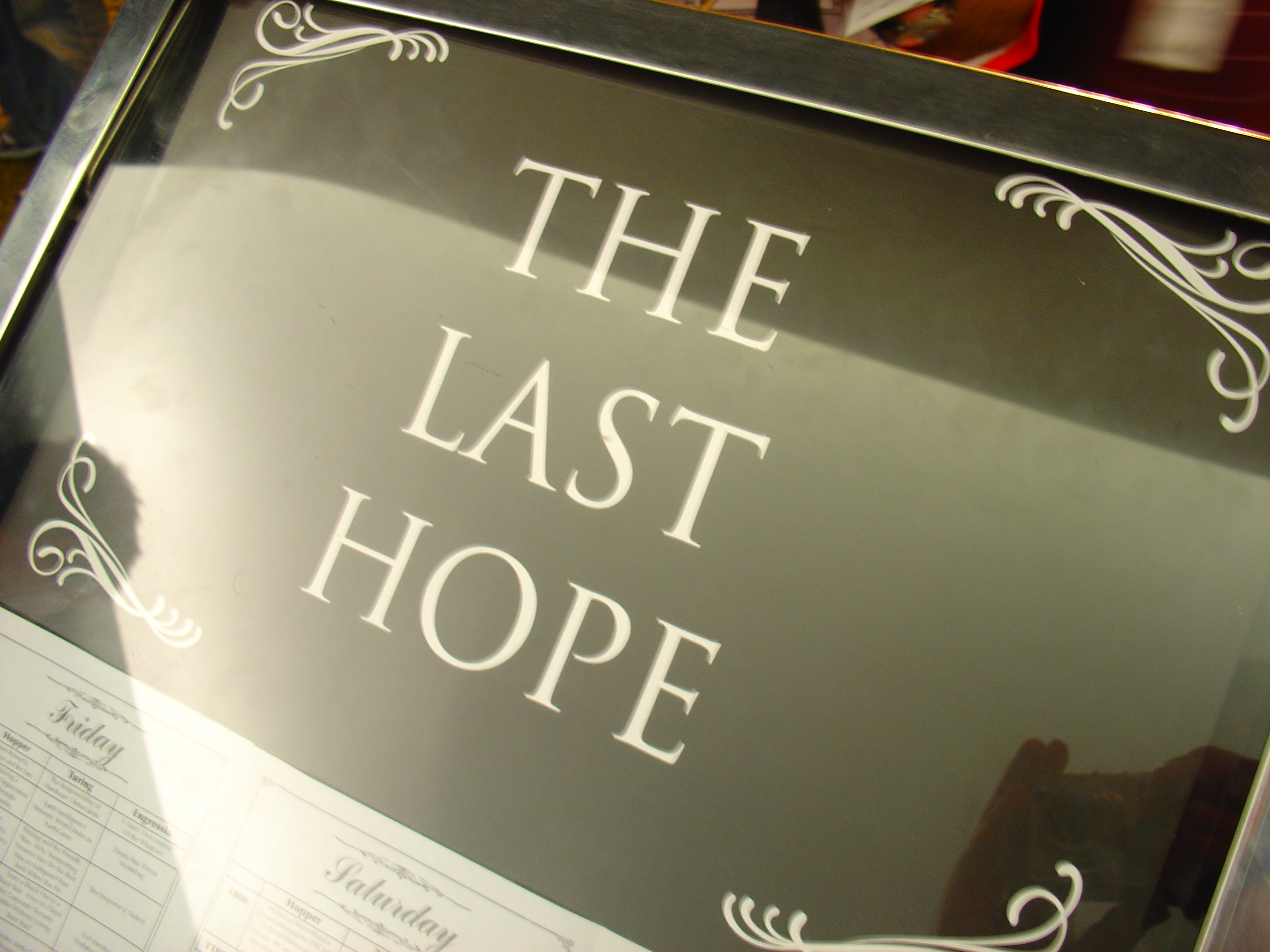
- The Last HOPE, 2008
- Genre: Hacker convention
- Frequency: Biennially (possibly annually starting in 2025)
- Venue: New York City, U.S. (was typically Hotel Pennsylvania)
- Locations: Queens, New York City, U.S.
- Coordinates: 40°44′59″N 73°59′26″W
- Inaugurated: August 13–14, 1994
- Most recent: August 14–16, 2026
- Organizer: 2600: The Hacker Quarterly
- People: Emmanuel Goldstein
- Sponsor: 2600
- Website: hope.net

The Hackers on Planet Earth (HOPE) conference series is a hacker convention sponsored by the security hacker magazine 2600: The Hacker Quarterly that until 2020 was typically held at Hotel Pennsylvania, in Manhattan, New York City.

Traditionally occurring biennially in the summer (possibly becoming annually after 2024), there have been 17 conferences to date. HOPE 2020, originally planned to be held at St. John's University, was instead held as a nine-day virtual event from 25 July to 2 August 2020. The most recent conference, "HOPE XV", was held at St. John's University in Queens from the 12th to 14 July 2024. HOPE features talks, workshops, demonstrations, tours, and movie screenings. The next HOPE conference, "HOPE_16" occurred at St. John's University in Queens from 15 to 17 August 2025, marking HOPE's announced transition to an annual event.

In November 2025 HOPE announced the conference had been banned by St. John's University due to a complaint about what were portrayed as "anti-police" pamphlets by an attendee, and the conference alleged there was no due process nor recourse from the university. HOPE requested assistance on securing a new venue and in March 2026 announced staff had secured a return to Manhattan at the New Yorker Hotel in Hell's Kitchen. HOPE 26 occurred 14–16 August 2026.

HOPE was significantly inspired by the quadrennial Hack-Tic events in the Netherlands which also inspired the annual Chaos Communication Congress (C3) held in Germany. Summercon was an additional influential predecessor.

In early 2026, HOPE became a non-profit 501(c)(3) organization.

== Structure ==
HOPE had been held at Hotel Pennsylvania in Midtown Manhattan every time except once since 1994 until the demolition of the structure, previous plans for which conference organizers helped circumvent in the past. It thereafter has been held at St. John's University in Queens. The event is always structured in a similar way. It consists of three days and three nights of activities, including talks, workshops, and performances. It also features hackerspace villages, a film festival, lock picking villages, a wide variety of vendors, art installations, live video, vintage computers, robots, an amateur/ham radio station, electronics workshops, and book signings.

The con and many other hackers and computer security conferences, and camps, from around the world are discussed on Off the Hook, a weekly hackers radio show on longtime NYC community radio station WBAI which is hosted by 2600 members and conference organizers.

== Conferences ==
=== HOPE: Hackers on Planet Earth ===
Held August 13–14, 1994 at the Hotel Pennsylvania, the first HOPE conference marked 2600: The Hacker Quarterly's 10th anniversary. Over 1,000 people attended, including speakers from around the world. Access to a 28.8 kbit/s local network was provided. This conference was visited and covered in the second episode of the "Your Radio Playhouse" show, later renamed This American Life.

=== Beyond HOPE ===
The August 8–10, 1997 Beyond HOPE conference was held at the Puck Building, in Manhattan, New York City. Attendance doubled, with 2,000 attendees. Bell Technology Group helped to support the hackers. The hacker group L0pht Heavy Industries presented a panel discussion that covered some of their recent projects, accomplishments, emerging trends and shortcomings in technologies, and a deep dive into Windows NT password internals. A TAP reunion and a recorded live broadcast of Off the Hook took place. A 10 Mbit/s local network was provided to attendees.

=== H2K ===
The 14–15 July 2000 HOPE returned to the Hotel Pennsylvania, where subsequent conferences have been held. The conference ran 24 hours a day, bringing in 2,300 attendees. Jello Biafra gave a keynote speech. In a cultural exchange between the punk rock icon/free speech activist and the hacker community, Jello drew connections between the two communities, despite his lack of computer experience. The EFF also raised thousands of dollars. The conference provided a working Ethernet and a T1 link to the internet.

=== H2K2 ===
H2K2, 12–14 July 2002, had a theme focused on U.S. Homeland Security Advisory System. H2K2 included two tracks of scheduled speakers, with a third track reserved for last-minute and self-scheduled speakers, a movie room, retrocomputing, musical performances, a State of the World Address by Jello Biafra, keynotes by Aaron McGruder and Siva Vaidhyanathan and discussions on the DMCA and DeCSS. Freedom Downtime premiered on Friday evening (July 14). The conference provided wireless 802.11b coverage and wired Ethernet, an open computer area for access to a 24-hour link to the Internet at "T-1ish" speeds, made available by the DataHaven Project and an internal network.

=== The Fifth HOPE ===
The Fifth HOPE, 9–11 July 2004, had a theme on propaganda, and commemorated the anniversaries of both the H.O.P.E. conferences and Off the Hook (with a live broadcast of the show from the conference, Beyond H.O.P.E.). Keynotes speakers were Kevin Mitnick, Steve Wozniak, and Jello Biafra. There was also a presentation by "members" of the Phone Losers of America who celebrated their tenth anniversary. The Cult of the Dead Cow hacker collective celebrated its twentieth anniversary at the conference. The conference provided access to a four-layer public network with two T1 lines, plus backup links to the internet via a public terminal cluster, various wired connections, a WiFi network on three floors and a video network.

=== HOPE Number Six ===
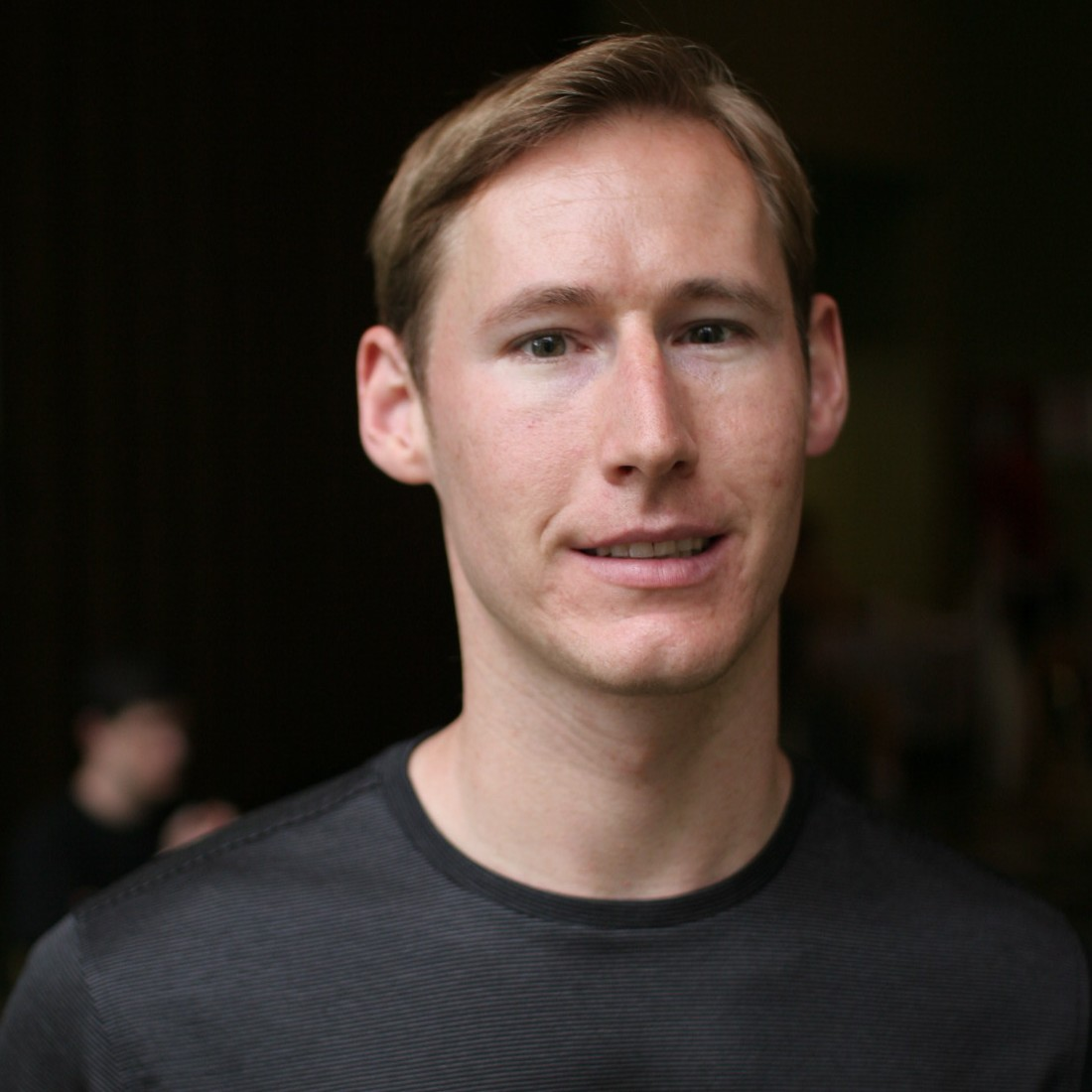
Fyodor (Insecure.Org) in a picture taken by Jacob Appelbaum at the HOPE Number 6 conference

HOPE Number Six, 21–23 July 2006, included talks from Richard Stallman and Jello Biafra. Kevin Mitnick was scheduled to be at the conference but was unable to appear: while on vacation in Colombia an illness prevented his timely return to the U.S. HOPE Number Six had a 100-megabit Internet connection; the conference organizers claimed it was the fastest Internet connection to-date at any U.S. hacker conference. The event's theme was based on the number six and The Prisoner (a designation shared by the titular "prisoner,"). Notable occurrences:

- Steve Rambam, a private investigator heading Pallorium, Inc., an online investigative service, was scheduled to lead a panel discussion titled "Privacy is Dead... Get Over It." A few minutes before the start of the panel, Rambam was arrested by the FBI on charges that he unlawfully interfered with an ongoing case Federal prosecutors filed against a former Brooklyn assistant New York district attorney indicted in January 2003 on a count of money-laundering. The charges were eventually dropped and the talk was subsequently held in November 2006, long after the conference.
- Jello Biafra began his talk by referring to the arrest of Steve Rambam, noting the convention had been more "spook heavy" than usual. He then announced a "special message" to "any Federal agents that may be in the audience", and mooned the convention.

=== The Last HOPE ===
"The Last HOPE" took place 18–20 July 2008 at the Hotel Pennsylvania. A change from past years was the use of an Internet forum to facilitate community participation in the planning of the event.

The conference name referred to the expectation that this would be the final H.O.P.E. conference due to the scheduled demolition of its venue, the Hotel Pennsylvania. The Save Hotel Pennsylvania Foundation was created to work toward keeping the building from being demolished by its then-new owner, Vornado Realty Trust. The "Next HOPE" was scheduled for Summer 2010. At the closing ceremony it was revealed that the use of the word "last" could also refer to the previous event, or one that had ended (referring to The Last HOPE itself).

Steven Levy gave the keynote address. Kevin Mitnick, Steve Rambam, Jello Biafra, Marcia Wilbur and Adam Savage of MythBusters were featured speakers. Descriptions and audio of the talks can be found at thelasthope.org

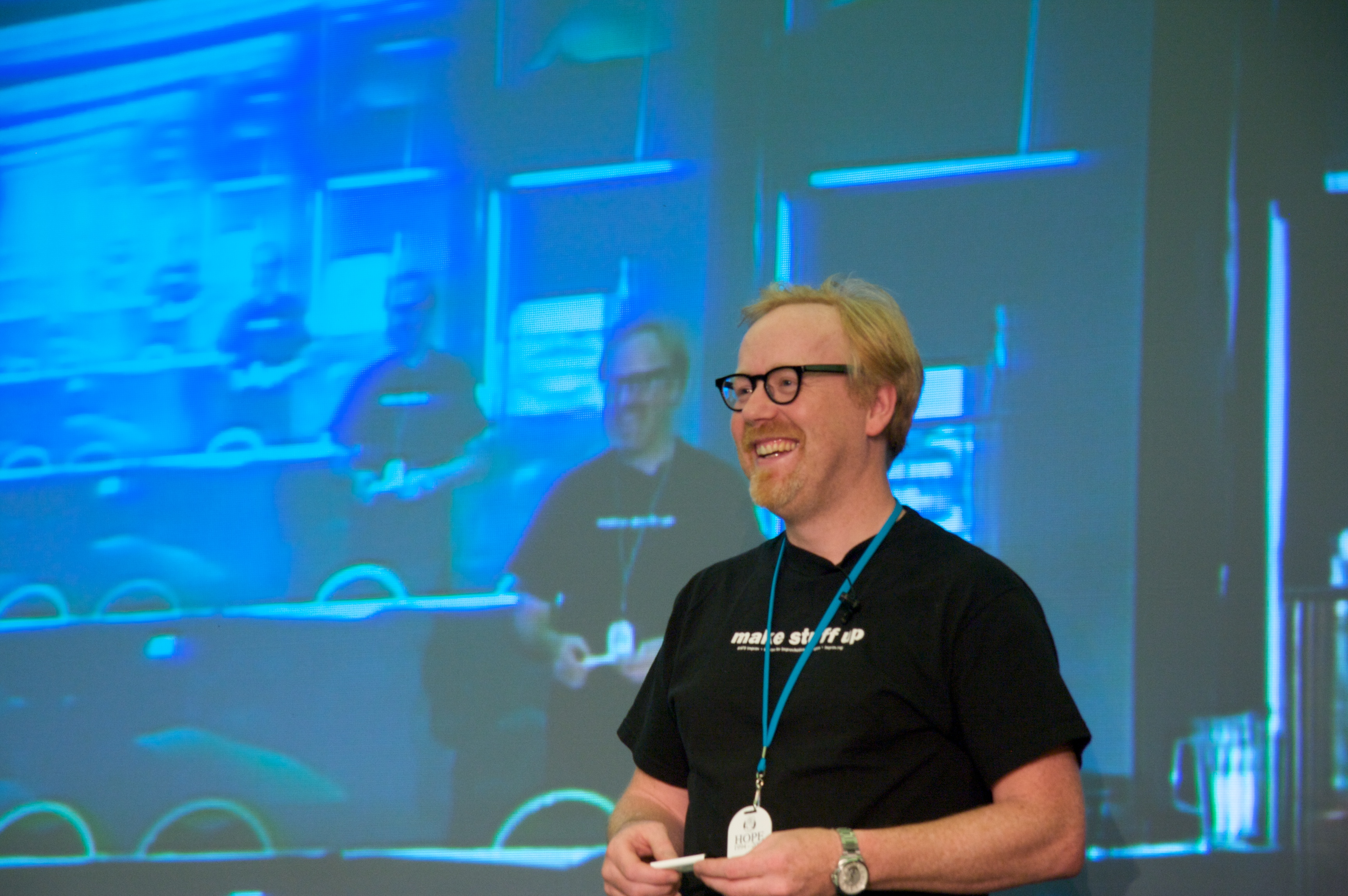
Adam Savage at The Last HOPE

=== The Next HOPE ===
The 8th HOPE convention, "The Next HOPE", took place on 16–18 July 2010. The Next HOPE was held at the Hotel Pennsylvania, as the plans by Vornado to demolish the hotel are on hold.

=== HOPE Number Nine ===
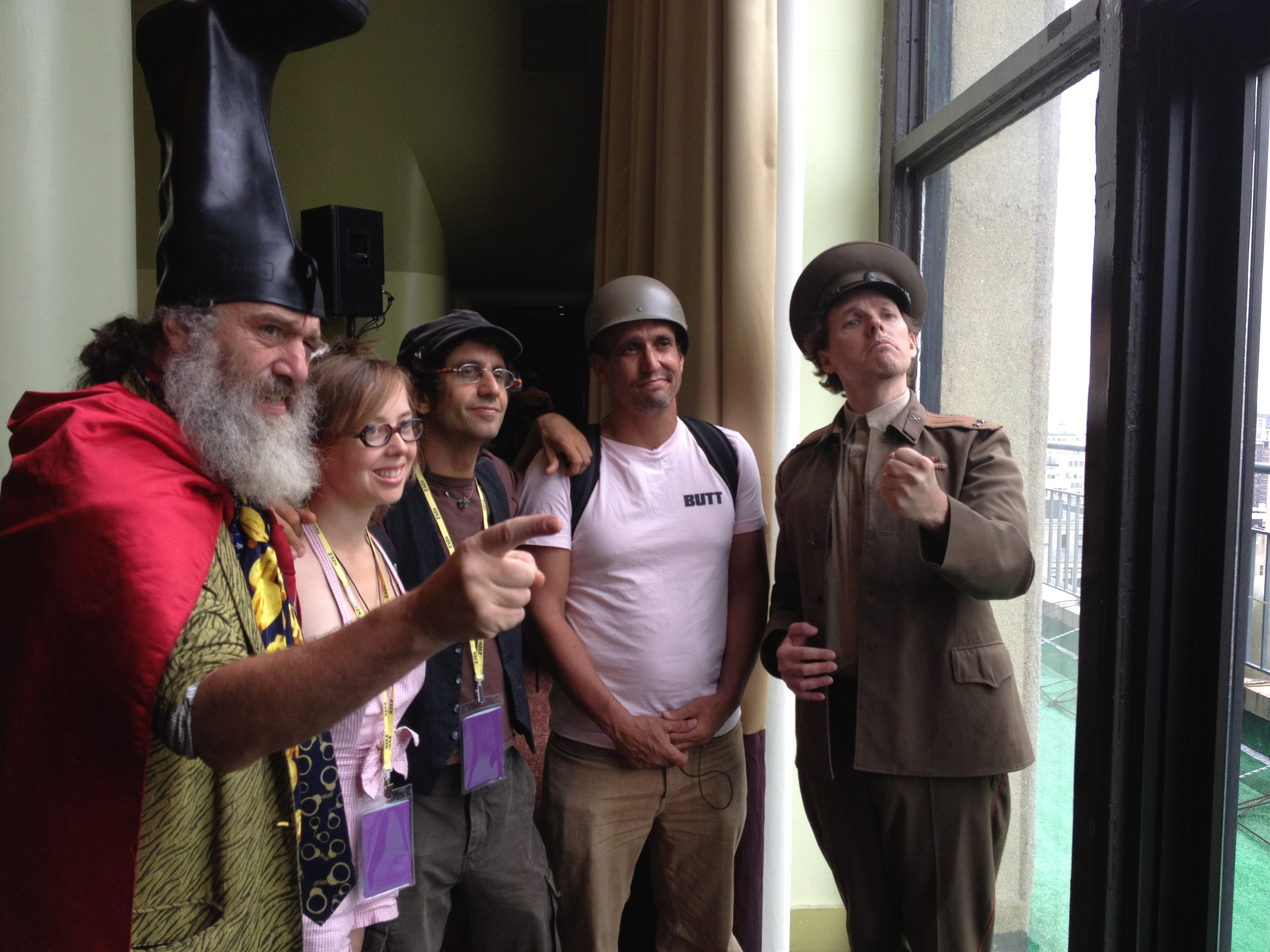
Vermin Supreme, The Yes Men and monochrom's Johannes Grenzfurthner at HOPE 2012

HOPE Number Nine occurred 13–15 July 2012 at Hotel Pennsylvania in Manhattan.

Keynote presentations for HOPE Number Nine were given by The Yes Men (with Andy Bichelbaum as principal speaker and Vermin Supreme also participating) and NSA whistleblower William Binney. Chris Kubecka, principal speaker of a presentation about internet censorship was served a cease and desist letter in an attempt to censor the presentation by Unisys and threatened with termination for a presentation titled "The Internet is for Porn! How High Heels and Fishnet Have Driven Internet Innovation and Information Security". Unisys demanded all information regarding the presentation be removed from the internet, but the Streisand effect occurred, with the censorship attempt posted on thousands of websites instead. A first for the conference, a ghost speaker @JK47theweapon had to deliver most of the presentation due to legal threats against Kubecka. Prior to beginning, the MC invited "any hangers on or associates of the law firm of Baker & McKenzie" to speak to the Electronic Frontier Foundation (EFF). Baker & McKenzie is the law firm of Unisys Netherlands which threatened to terminate its employee by letter for giving a presentation about internet censorship.

=== HOPE X ===
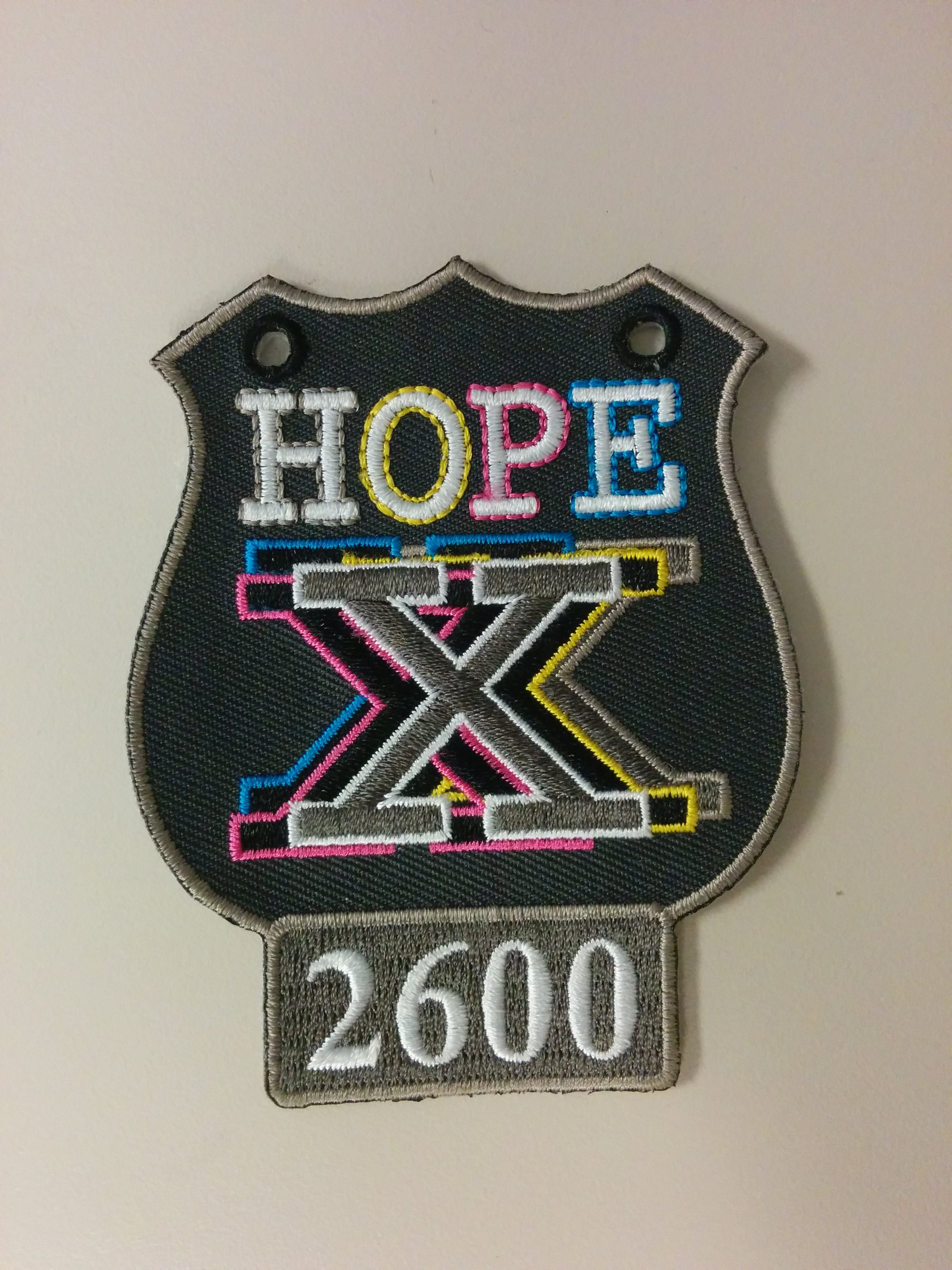
The badge used at HOPE X. It was a patch evocative of a police shield, with the 2600 logo prominent at the bottom.

HOPE X took place from 18 to 20 July 2014 at Hotel Pennsylvania. The keynote speakers were Daniel Ellsberg and Edward Snowden; also featured was noted former NSA official and whistleblower Thomas Drake. The theme of the conference was "dissent", and whistle-blowing was a topic of a good number of talks.

Notable changes included a massive increase in available bandwidth. Previous conferences had a 50 Mbit connection; HOPE X had a 10 Gbit fibre optic connection provided by Hurricane Electric. This geometric increase in bandwidth made possible live streaming of all conference talks in real time. The Ellsberg/Snowden keynote was seen in over 120 countries. This also was the first year all conference areas were fully connected to the conference network, albeit with the Workshop floor with slightly limited connectivity (a 1 Gbit connection, as compared to the 10 Gbit backbone of the other conference spaces). Five different wireless networks were provided to conference attendees. The hammocks on the mezzanine level, which provided a place for some attendees to sleep if they were unable to procure a place to otherwise do so, were replaced by inflatable furniture in a dedicated "Chill Space" area. Mezzanine space was also explicitly dedicated to attendee meetups in the form of villages, similar to assemblies at Chaos Communication Congresses and villages at hacker camps, specifically "Village Zone A" (primarily a soldering and electronics workshop), "Village Zone B", "Lockpickers Village", and "Noisy Square". Workshop tracks were published in the schedule and the conference took nearly all the hotel's available meeting space.

=== HOPE XI ===
HOPE XI (The Eleventh HOPE) took place from 22 to 24 July 2016 at Hotel Pennsylvania. Cory Doctorow was the keynote speaker. Like last time, HOPE XI was provided Internet transit by Hurricane Electric at 111 Eighth Avenue over a fiber connection leased from RCN Corporation. Aruba Networks sponsored 50 wireless access points which were used to provide 3 wireless networks for attendees, two of which were secured with either WPA or PSK, another network for the NOC, and one for the press and speakers.

Network connectivity was fully provided for in all areas, which came into use throughout the conference as many talks were filled to capacity and attendees either watched streams on their own devices or in designated overflow and viewing areas.

=== The Circle of HOPE (HOPE 12) ===
The 12th HOPE conference, "The Circle of HOPE", occurred 20–22 July 2018. Speakers included Chelsea Manning, Barrett Brown, Richard Stallman, Jason Scott, Matt Blaze, Micah Lee, and Steve Rambam, among many others. The conference was marked by protests from alt-right activists.

=== HOPE 2020 ===
A conference was originally planned for 31 July-2 August 2020 at a new venue, St. John's University in Fresh Meadows, Queens. Due to the COVID-19 pandemic it was changed to a nine-day virtual event from 25 July to 2 August 2020. In addition to a longer schedule for talks, most of the originally planned events will be streamed, including workshops and musical performances. Keynote speakers are Libby Liu of the Open Technology Fund (OTF), Flavio Aggio of the World Health Organization (WHO), Idalin Bobé of TechActivist.org, Tiffany Rad of Anatrope Inc, Yeshimabeit Milner of Data for Black Lives, Jaron Lanier, Cindy Cohn, Cory Doctorow, and Richard Thieme. Conference participants communicated primarily using the first year appearance of HOPE's own Matrix chat server.

=== 2021 canceled plan ===
An in-person HOPE conference was planned for summer 2021, breaking from the typical biennial conference interval, but was cancelled due to the ongoing COVID-19 pandemic.

=== A New HOPE ===
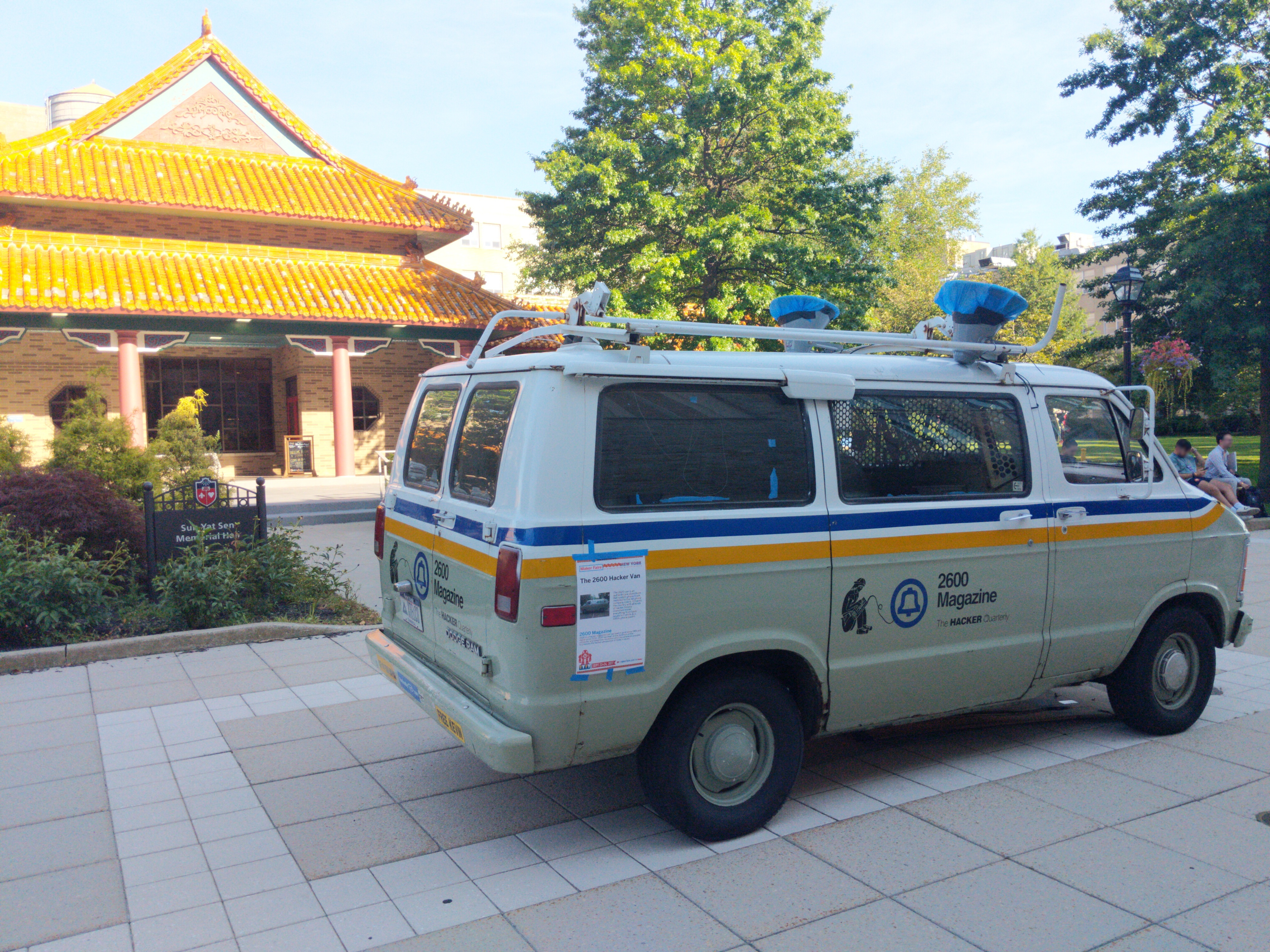
The 2600 van, on display at A New HOPE

The 14th conference, A New Hope, was held at St. John's University in Queens, New York City from 22 to 24 July 2022. The event was a hybrid event, combining a virtual online event with the in-person event in New York, using Matrix combined with video streaming of the talks.

The keynote was a conversation between Facebook whistleblower Sophie Zhang and Yan Zhu.

Further notable occurrences:

- Munira Mohamed and Chris Weiland, activist citizens: talk entitled "Hacking Local Politics: How We Banned Facial Recognition in Minneapolis"
- Cory Doctorow, author and EFF activist: talk entitled "Seize the Means of Computation"
- Marcia K Wilbur, developer, maker, advocate and author: Hosted "AIOT Village" complete with 3D printer, robotics materials (arduino), raspberry pi units and much more.

=== HOPE XV ===
The 15th conference was held at St. John's University in Queens, New York City from 12 to 14 July 2024.

- Cory Doctorow gave a talk on "enshittification"
- Marcia K. Wilbur gave a talk on “TLDR: Terms of Service – Privacy, Data Collection, and Coercive Agreements”

=== HOPE_16 ===
The 16th con was stylized HOPE_16 and was announced as a switch to annual events, again held at St. John's University and this time a month later than the typical July dates preceding DEF CON and Black Hat, from 15 to 17 August 2025. Significant speakers included 404 Media co-founder Joseph Cox, author Seth Godin, CIA whistleblower John Kiriakou, former Barack Obama campaign CTO Harper Reed, "myth buster" Davis DeWitt, Kagi search engine CEO Vladimir Prelovac, ICEBlock developer Joshua Aaron, and engineer/seed investor Sahil Lavingia who worked at "DOGE".

== See also ==
- Chaos Communication Camp
