= 2600: The Hacker Quarterly =

American underground technology publication

- Spring 2012 issue of 2600
- Editor: Emmanuel Goldstein (Eric Gordon Corley)
- Categories: Computers, technology
- Frequency: Quarterly
- Publisher: 2600 Enterprises Inc.
- Total circulation: 52,250 (2009)
- Founded: 1984
- Country: United States
- Based in: Middle Island, New York
- Language: English
- Website: 2600.com
- ISSN: 0749-3851

2600: The Hacker Quarterly is an American seasonal publication of technical information and articles, many of which are written and submitted by the readership, on a variety of subjects including hacking, telephone switching systems, and Internet protocols and services, as well as general news concerning the computer underground.

With origins in the phone phreaking community and late 20th-century counterculture, 2600 and its associated conference transitioned to coverage of modern hacker culture, and the magazine has become a platform for speaking out against increased digital surveillance and advocacy of personal and digital freedoms.

== Publication history ==
The magazine's name comes from the phreaker discovery in the 1960s that the transmission of a 2600 hertz tone – which could be produced perfectly with a plastic toy whistle given away free with Cap'n Crunch cereal, discovered by friends of John Draper – over a long-distance trunk connection gained access to operator mode, and allowed the user to explore aspects of the telephone system that were not otherwise accessible. The magazine was given its name by David Ruderman, who co-founded the magazine with his college friend, Eric Corley. Ruderman ended his direct involvement with the magazine three years later.

The magazine traces its origins to early Bulletin Board Systems as a place for hackers to share information and stories with each other. It was launched in January 1984, coinciding with the book of the same name and the break-up of AT&T. It is published and edited by its co-founder Emmanuel Goldstein (a pen name of Corley which is a reference to the Emmanuel Goldstein in George Orwell's novel 1984) and his company 2600 Enterprises, Inc. 2600 is released on the first Friday of the month following a season change, usually January, April, July, and October.

Goldstein has published a compilation of articles from the magazine entitled The Best of 2600: A Hacker Odyssey. The book, an 888-page hardcover, has been available from July 28, 2008, in the US and August 8, 2008, in the UK and is published by Wiley.

== "Hacker" term ==
In the usage of 2600 and affiliates, the often loaded term hacking refers to grey hat hacking, which is generally understood to be any sort of technological utilization or manipulation of technology which goes above and beyond the capabilities inherent to the design of a given application. This usage attempts to maintain neutrality, as opposed to the politically charged and often contentious terms white hat hacking (which some consider hacking motivated exclusively by good, benevolent intentions—such as hardware modding or penetration testing), and black hat hacking (which some consider to be hacking motivated exclusively by malicious or selfish intentions, such as electronic theft, vandalism, hijacking of websites, and other types of cybercrime). Other hackers believe that hat-color labels are an oversimplification and unnecessary designation, best suited for use by the media, and suggest that people who use hacking to commit crimes already have a label, that of criminal.

== Conferences and meetings ==
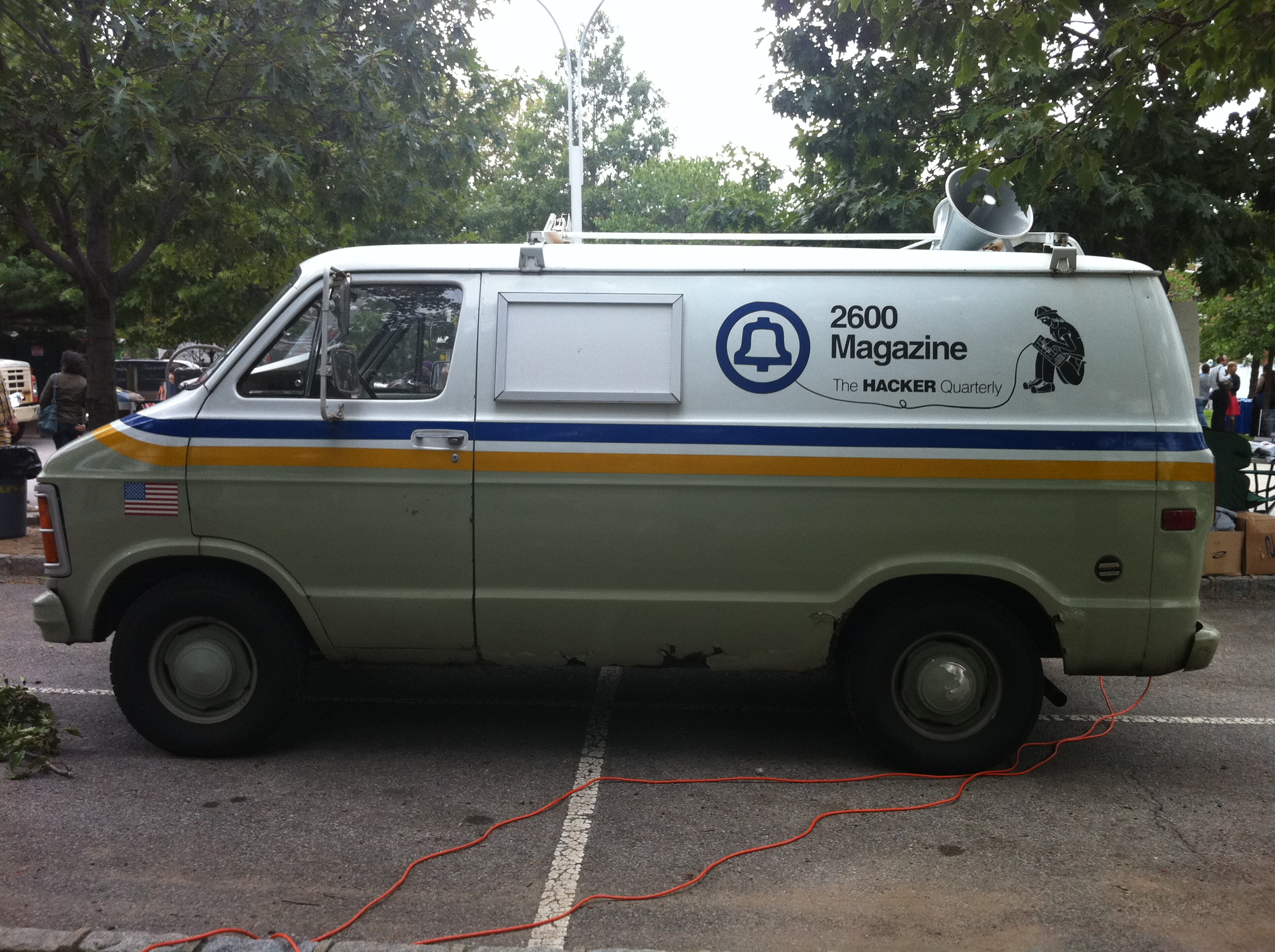
The 2600 van, a modified New York Telephone vehicle

2600 established the H.O.P.E. (Hackers on Planet Earth) conference in 1994, marking the publication's tenth anniversary. The conference is held now at The New Yorker Hotel in Manhattan, New York. Historically, before it was demolished, the conference was held at the Hotel Pennsylvania, in Manhattan, New York City, with the exception of the second HOPE in 1997, held at the Puck Building in Manhattan. The convention features events such as presentations, talks, concerts, and workshops. Speakers have included computer security figures and hackers such as Kevin Mitnick, Steven Levy, Richard Stallman, and Steve Wozniak, as well as whistleblowers William Binney, Daniel Ellsberg, and Edward Snowden, and countercultural figures like Jello Biafra and The Yes Men.

There are monthly meetings in over 24 countries. The meetings are listed in the back of the magazine, and are advertised as being open to anyone regardless of age or level of expertise.

== In other media ==
2600 Films produced a feature-length documentary about famed hacker Kevin Mitnick, the Free Kevin movement and the hacker world, entitled Freedom Downtime, and is currently working on one titled Speakers' World.

Corley is also host of Off The Wall and Off the Hook, two New York talk radio shows. Both shows can be downloaded or streamed via the 2600 site, and are also broadcast on various radio stations:

- Off the Hook is broadcast on WBAI (99.5 FM)
- Off The Wall is broadcast on WUSB (90.1 FM).

In the 1995 movie Hackers, a character named Emmanuel Goldstein, also known as "Cereal Killer", was portrayed by Matthew Lillard.

Windows XP's RTM build number was intentionally bumped to 2600 as a tongue-in-cheek reference to the 2600 magazine.

== Court cases ==
2600 has been involved in many court cases related to technology and freedom of speech alongside the Electronic Frontier Foundation, perhaps most significantly Universal v. Reimerdes involving the distribution of DVD copy protection tool DeCSS, where courts upheld the constitutionality of the Digital Millennium Copyright Act anti-circumvention provisions.

The magazine itself received a copyright claim for the ink spatter stock image featured on the Spring 2012 issue from Trunk Archive, an image licensing agency, using an automated image tracking toolkit. While Trunk Archive identified its own image that featured the ink spatter as the source, it was discovered that the original ink spatter was created by the Finnish artist Jukka Korhonen, on DeviantArt, who had released it into the public domain. Trunk Archive later retracted the claim and sent a letter to 2600 apologizing for the mistake.
