= Intelligence amplification =

Use of information technology to augment human intelligence

Intelligence amplification (IA), also known as augmented intelligence or cognitive augmentation, refers to the use of information technology to enhance human cognitive capabilities, such as reasoning, learning, problem-solving, and decision-making, rather than replacing human intelligence with autonomous artificial systems. The idea was first proposed in the 1950s and 1960s by cybernetics and early computer pioneers.

IA is sometimes contrasted with AI (artificial intelligence), that is, the project of building a human-like intelligence in the form of an autonomous technological system such as a computer or robot. AI has encountered many fundamental obstacles, practical as well as theoretical, which for IA seem moot, as it needs technology merely as an extra support for an autonomous intelligence that has already proven to function. Moreover, IA has a long history of success, since all forms of information technology, from the abacus to writing to the Internet, have been developed basically to extend the information processing capabilities of the human mind (see extended mind and distributed cognition).

== Major contributions ==
=== William Ross Ashby: Intelligence Amplification ===
The term intelligence amplification (IA) has enjoyed a wide currency since William Ross Ashby wrote of "amplifying intelligence" in his Introduction to Cybernetics (1956). Related ideas were explicitly proposed as an alternative to Artificial Intelligence by Hao Wang from the early days of automatic theorem provers.

... "problem solving" is largely, perhaps entirely, a matter of appropriate selection. Take, for instance, any popular book of problems and puzzles. Almost every one can be reduced to the form: out of a certain set, indicate one element. ... It is, in fact, difficult to think of a problem, either playful or serious, that does not ultimately require an appropriate selection as necessary and sufficient for its solution.

It is also clear that many of the tests used for measuring "intelligence" are scored essentially according to the candidate's power of appropriate selection. ... Thus it is not impossible that what is commonly referred to as "intellectual power" may be equivalent to "power of appropriate selection". Indeed, if a talking Black Box were to show high power of appropriate selection in such matters—so that, when given difficult problems it persistently gave correct answers—we could hardly deny that it was showing the 'behavioral' equivalent of "high intelligence".

If this is so, and as we know that power of selection can be amplified, it seems to follow that intellectual power, like physical power, can be amplified. Let no one say that it cannot be done, for the gene-patterns do it every time they form a brain that grows up to be something better than the gene-pattern could have specified in detail. What is new is that we can now do it synthetically, consciously, deliberately.

— W. Ross Ashby, An Introduction to Cybernetics, Chapman and Hall, London, UK, 1956. Reprinted, Methuen and Company, London, UK, 1964.

=== J. C. R. Licklider: Man-Computer Symbiosis ===
"Man-Computer Symbiosis" is a key speculative paper published in 1960 by psychologist/computer scientist J.C.R. Licklider, which envisions that mutually-interdependent, "living together", tightly-coupled human brains and computing machines would prove to complement each other's strengths to a high degree:

Man-computer symbiosis is a subclass of man-machine systems. There are many man-machine systems. At present, however, there are no man-computer symbioses. The purposes of this paper are to present the concept and, hopefully, to foster the development of man-computer symbiosis by analyzing some problems of interaction between men and computing machines, calling attention to applicable principles of man-machine engineering, and pointing out a few questions to which research answers are needed. The hope is that, in not too many years, human brains and computing machines will be coupled together very tightly, and that the resulting partnership will think as no human brain has ever thought and process data in a way not approached by the information-handling machines we know today.

— J. C. R. Licklider, "Man-Computer Symbiosis", IRE Transactions on Human Factors in Electronics, vol. HFE-1, 4-11, March 1960.

In Licklider's vision, many of the pure artificial intelligence systems envisioned at the time by over-optimistic researchers would prove unnecessary. (This paper is also seen by some historians as marking the genesis of ideas about computer networks which later blossomed into the Internet).

=== Douglas Engelbart: Augmenting Human Intellect ===
Licklider's research was similar in spirit to his DARPA contemporary and protégé Douglas Engelbart. Both men’s work helped expand the utility of computers beyond mere computational machines by conceiving and demonstrating them as a primary interface for humans to process and manipulate information.

Engelbart reasoned that the state of our current technology controls our ability to manipulate information, and that fact in turn will control our ability to develop new, improved technologies. He thus set himself to the revolutionary task of developing computer-based technologies for manipulating information directly, and also to improve individual and group processes for knowledge-work. Engelbart's philosophy and research agenda is most clearly and directly expressed in the 1962 research report: Augmenting Human Intellect: A Conceptual Framework The concept of network augmented intelligence is attributed to Engelbart based on this pioneering work.

Increasing the capability of a man to approach a complex problem situation, to gain comprehension to suit his particular needs, and to derive solutions to problems.

Increased capability in this respect is taken to mean a mixture of the following: more-rapid comprehension, better comprehension, the possibility of gaining a useful degree of comprehension in a situation that previously was too complex, speedier solutions, better solutions, and the possibility of finding solutions to problems that before seemed insolvable. And by complex situations we include the professional problems of diplomats, executives, social scientists, life scientists, physical scientists, attorneys, designers--whether the problem situation exists for twenty minutes or twenty years.

We do not speak of isolated clever tricks that help in particular situations. We refer to a way of life in an integrated domain where hunches, cut-and-try, intangibles, and the human feel for a situation usefully co-exist with powerful concepts, streamlined terminology and notation, sophisticated methods, and high-powered electronic aids.

— Douglas Engelbart, Augmenting Human Intellect: A Conceptual Framework, Summary Report AFOSR-3233, Stanford Research Institute, Menlo Park, CA, October 1962.

In the same research report he addresses the term "Intelligence Amplification" as coined by Ashby, and reflects on how his proposed research relates.

Engelbart subsequently implemented these concepts in his Augmented Human Intellect Research Center at SRI International, developing essentially an intelligence amplifying system of tools (NLS) and co-evolving organizational methods, in full operational use by the mid-1960s within the lab. As intended, his R&D team experienced increasing degrees of intelligence amplification, as both rigorous users and rapid-prototype developers of the system. For a sampling of research results, see their 1968 Mother of All Demos.

== Later contributions ==
Howard Rheingold worked at Xerox PARC in the 1980s and was introduced to both Bob Taylor and Douglas Engelbart; Rheingold wrote about "mind amplifiers" in his 1985 book, Tools for Thought. Andrews Samraj mentioned in "Skin-Close Computing and Wearable Technology" 2021, about Human augmentation by two varieties of cyborgs, namely, Hard cyborgs and Soft cyborgs. A humanoid walking machine is an example of the soft cyborg and a pace-maker is an example for augmenting human as a hard cyborg.

Arnav Kapur working at MIT wrote about human-AI coalescence: how AI can be integrated into human condition as part of "human self": as a tertiary layer to the human brain to augment human cognition. He demonstrates this using a peripheral nerve-computer interface, AlterEgo, which enables a human user to silently and internally converse with a personal AI.

In 2014 the technology of Artificial Swarm Intelligence was developed to amplify the intelligence of networked human groups using AI algorithms modeled on biological swarms. The technology enables small teams to make predictions, estimations and medical diagnoses at accuracy levels that significantly exceed natural human intelligence.

Shan Carter and Michael Nielsen introduce the concept of artificial intelligence augmentation (AIA): the use of AI systems to help develop new methods for intelligence augmentation. They contrast cognitive outsourcing (AI as an oracle, able to solve some large class of problems with better-than-human performance) with cognitive transformation (changing the operations and representations we use to think). A calculator is an example of the former; a spreadsheet of the latter.

Ron Fulbright describes human cognitive augmentation in human/cog ensembles involving humans working in collaborative partnership with cognitive systems (called cogs). By working together, human/cog ensembles achieve results superior to those obtained by the humans working alone or the cognitive systems working alone. The human component of the ensemble is therefore cognitively augmented. The degree of augmentation depends on the proportion of the total amount of cognition done by the human and that done by the cog. Six Levels of Cognitive Augmentation have been identified:

Levels of Human Cognitive Augmentation
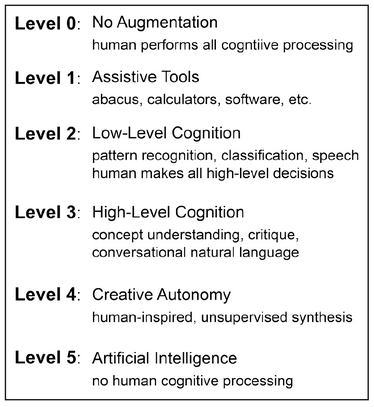

== In science fiction ==
Augmented intelligence has been a repeating theme in science fiction. A positive view of brain implants used to communicate with a computer as a form of augmented intelligence is seen in Algis Budrys 1976 novel Michaelmas. Fear that the technology will be misused by the government and military is an early theme. In the 1981 BBC serial The Nightmare Man the pilot of a high-tech mini submarine is linked to his craft via a brain implant but becomes a savage killer after ripping out the implant.

Perhaps the most well known writer exploring themes of intelligence augmentation is William Gibson, in work such as his 1981 story "Johnny Mnemonic", in which the title character has computer-augmented memory, and his 1984 novel Neuromancer, in which computer hackers interface through brain-computer interfaces to computer systems. Vernor Vinge, as discussed earlier, looked at intelligence augmentation as a possible route to the technological singularity, a theme which also appears in his fiction.

Flowers for Algernon is an early example of augmented intelligence in science fiction literature. First published as a short story in 1959, the plot concerns an intellectually disabled man who undergoes an experiment to increase his intelligence to genius levels. His rise and fall is detailed in his journal entries, which become more sophisticated as his intelligence increases.

== See also ==
- Advanced chess
- Augmented learning
- Brain–computer interface
- Charles Sanders Peirce
- Collective intelligence
- Democratic transhumanism
- Emotiv Systems
- Extelligence
- External memory (psychology)
- Exocortex
- Knowledge worker
- Mechanization
- Neuroenhancement
- Nootropic
- Sensemaking (information science)
- The Wisdom of Crowds
- Augmented Intelligence (Christies)
