= Speed learning =

Set of techniques intended to increase learning rate

Speed learning is a collection of methods of learning which attempt to attain higher rates of learning without unacceptable reduction of comprehension or retention. It is closely related to speed reading, but encompasses other methods of learning, such as observation, listening, conversation, questioning, and reflection.

The general approach is to use procedures or a sequence of techniques that have been shown to provide a more efficient path to attaining the same goal. Some of the techniques have existed since ancient times (e.g. mnemonics) whilst others are a result of more recent scientific research (e.g. forgetting curves). Some of these methods contain Active recall, Spaced repetition etc.

== History ==
Psychologists and educational specialists have long sought methods for improving not just the quality of learning, the comprehension and retention of knowledge, but the rate at which knowledge can be acquired, especially in an age in which the amount of information people need to deal with is growing rapidly and threatening to overwhelm them.

The limited "channel capacity" of human individuals has also led to investigation of rapid knowledge acquisition and appropriate dissemination of it by organizations. This is an important part of the science of management. It generally involves dividing the knowledge-acquisition effort among multiple individuals, each of whom becomes a "subject matter expert" on some specialized area of the larger topic, then having them extract and abstract the more important findings and recommendations from that investigation into reports to and discussions with others in the organization. This filtering process necessarily involves some loss of detail, but if done well should enable the organization or its managers to make high-quality, error-avoiding decisions. On the other hand, the loss of detail as abstraction of information ascends a hierarchical organization can lead to distortion that results in bad decision-making.

== Speed listening ==
Speed listening is a sub category of speed learning in which students seek to increase the rate at which they can listen while retaining full comprehension. Doing so enables students to intake more information in a shorter period of time while listening. It is most commonly used while using text-to-speech tools like Speechify, audiobook platforms like Audible, or Podcast tools like Apple's iTunes.

== See also ==
- Learning styles – Theories that aim to account for differences in individuals' learning
- Visualization – Set of techniques for creating images, diagrams, or animations to communicate a message
- Fixation (visual) – Maintaining one's gaze on a single location
- Reading – Taking in the meaning of letters or symbols
- Subvocalization – Internal process while reading
- Vision span – Arc of accurate visual perception
- SQ3R – Reading comprehension method
- Speed reading – Techniques claiming to improve the ability to read quickly
- Learning curve – Relationship between proficiency and experience
- Performance – Act of staging or presenting a form of entertainment
- Expert – Person with broad and profound competence in a particular field
- Skill – Ability to carry out a task
- Game – Structured form of play
- Dance – Art form consisting of body movement
- Mathematics – Field of knowledge
- Social skills – Competence facilitating interaction and communication with others
