= Loqu8 =

Software company

- Release: 2008
- Operating system: Windows
- Platform: PC
- Type: Information management
- License: Perpetual, subscription and site
- Website: www.loqu8.com

Loqu8 is a software company that helps users access and learn information, such as languages and real-time facts. Its products are based on an augmented learning model that was originally developed using cognitive science and information processing research at Caltech and Stanford University. Users interact with the augmented environment by touching the screen or pointing to content with a mouse. A pop-up window immediately displays contextually-relevant information with links to supporting resources. Behind the scenes, the text surrounding the mouse pointer is evaluated and supplemental information (e.g., web search, language translation, images and speech) is presented. Powered by Loqu8's iNtution engine, the software promises to help users learn information quickly; a pop-up window is displayed in a fraction of a second (typically, 100 milliseconds).

In October 2009, the company previewed real-time visual search at the Web 2.0 Summit in San Francisco. The pop-up window showed instant web searches (via Microsoft Bing) and touch screen search using Microsoft Windows 7.

== Augmented learning ==
Memorization, the deliberate mental process or storing information for future recall, is one of the most common learning practices. Since the information must be stored before it is actually needed, learners can become frustrated when they are unable to recall the information when it is needed. By comparison, augmented learning shifts the focus to learning “on-demand”.

When a learner browses the web or reads a document, the act of pointing with a mouse or touching a screen commands a pop-up window to provide supplemental information. This in-context, augmented content may take the form of text, images, video, or even music or speech. By tailoring the supplemental content to the learner's immediate environment, the learner associates the supplemental information with the original text.

For example, in Microsoft Outlook email, a user could hover a mouse over an unfamiliar word—even in a different language—to see a translation and definition and even hear the word pronounced. Other options would be to see the targeted word in news articles or images tagged with the same word.

== Products and users ==
The company's products implement augmented intelligence and understanding practices to communicate information in a contextually-relevant manner.

In 2013, Loqu8 introduced iCE Learn Chinese, Version. In an effort to make understanding, using and learning Chinese easier, this latest iteration offered support for Cantonese-English (dictionary with optional Cantonese text-to-speech), and RubyDefs (short definitions annotated to text) plus support for character tone marks (similar to Pinyin tone marks). In addition to LiveScan and HighlightScan, the enhanced ClipboardScan worked with the broadest range of websites, instant messaging and productivity applications. It featured support for vertical Chinese text.

In 2010, the company previewed Insight (code named "Prelude"), an instant information access tool for cloud-based business applications like Microsoft SharePoint, Salesforce.com CRM and Google Docs. Insight reached the semi-finals round at the Salesforce.com AppQuest 2010 contest.

The company's educational products embody augmented learning technologies to teach languages. Loqu8 iCE (iNterpret Chinese-English) displays a pop-up window to show Chinese to English translations and links to supplemental materials (news, images, video, chat). An upgraded version, iCE Professional, allows the user to customize the translation dictionary with personal entries, notes and usage examples. iCE version 6 was the first program to support parallel, multiple dictionaries (Chinese-English, Chinese-German, Chinese-French) and multi-language extensions (MLX) auto-translations of Chinese into 50 languages, including: Afrikaans, Albanian, Arabic, Belarusian, Bulgarian, Catalan, Croatian, Czech, Danish, Dutch, English, Estonian, Filipino, Finnish, French, Galician, German, Greek, Haitian (Creole), Hebrew, Hindi, Hungarian, Icelandic, Indonesian, Irish, Italian, Japanese, Korean, Latvian, Lithuanian, Macedonian, Malay, Maltese, Norwegian, Persian, Polish, Portuguese, Romanian, Russian, Serbian, Slovak, Slovenian, Spanish, Swahili, Swedish, Thai, Turkish, Ukrainian, Vietnamese, Welsh and Yiddish. Recent feature enhancements have included support for native, 64-bit Windows, WebTranslate, premium voices with rate control and support for PDF documents.

Copyworks re-creates the augmented learning environment on paper by including annotations on "copysheets" and paper flashcards.

Loqu8's augmented learning technologies have been deployed at the United States Department of State, EU European Commission and United Nations. Educational users include Columbia, Johns Hopkins, MIT, Peking University, Stanford, UC Berkeley, Harvard and University of Tokyo. Corporate users include ConocoPhilips, DuPont, Fluor, China Shanghai Nuclear Power, Cummins, New York Life, General Mills, Microsoft and UBS.

== History and ownership ==
The company was founded in 2008 and launched its first products in the same year. The company is privately held. The company's headquarters are in Silicon Valley. Previous acclaims include: "Microsoft Startup to Watch," "Startup of the Day," and finalist at the HYSTA Entrepreneur Boot Camp.

== See also ==
- Aptitude
- Augmented learning
- Learning speed
- Memorization
- Open learning
- Rote learning
