= Arnav Kapur =

Computer scientist

Arnav Kapur is a computer scientist and engineer at MIT. He is known for his work and advocacy in developing AI systems that enhance and complement human abilities.

== Career ==
In 2016, Kapur worked at the Biomedical Cybernetics Laboratory at Harvard Medical School. While at Harvard, he showed that gene expression data in microarray and RNA-Seq experiments, could be considered approximately low-rank, which could then be used to reliably predict the data.

After this, Kapur attended Massachusetts Institute of Technology, working at the MIT Media Lab. While at MIT, he developed a peripheral neural interface, dubbed AlterEgo, that recorded neuromuscular signals, sent from the brain to the various muscles of the speech system through subtle and voluntary stimulation, and transcribed them into basic speech commands. This created a silent speech interface, having applications in facilitating speech for individuals who had lost the ability to communicate verbally. In 2018, Kapur in an interview with 60 Minutes, detailed the inner workings of the prototype and showcased a live demonstration. In 2019, Kapur gave a talk at TED, and demonstrated an updated version of the system. He talked about how ethics can inform design and engineering as a principle and advocated for technologies such as AI to be designed in a way that extended human capabilities.

Kapur has also exhibited artwork and AI tools that collaborate with human artists. His work has been exhibited at alt.ai New York, Design Museum, Art Center Nabi.

== Awards ==
In 2020, Kapur featured on TIME magazine's 100 Best Inventions of 2020. He has been awarded the Lemelson-MIT graduate prize.
