= Learning curve =

Relationship between proficiency and experience

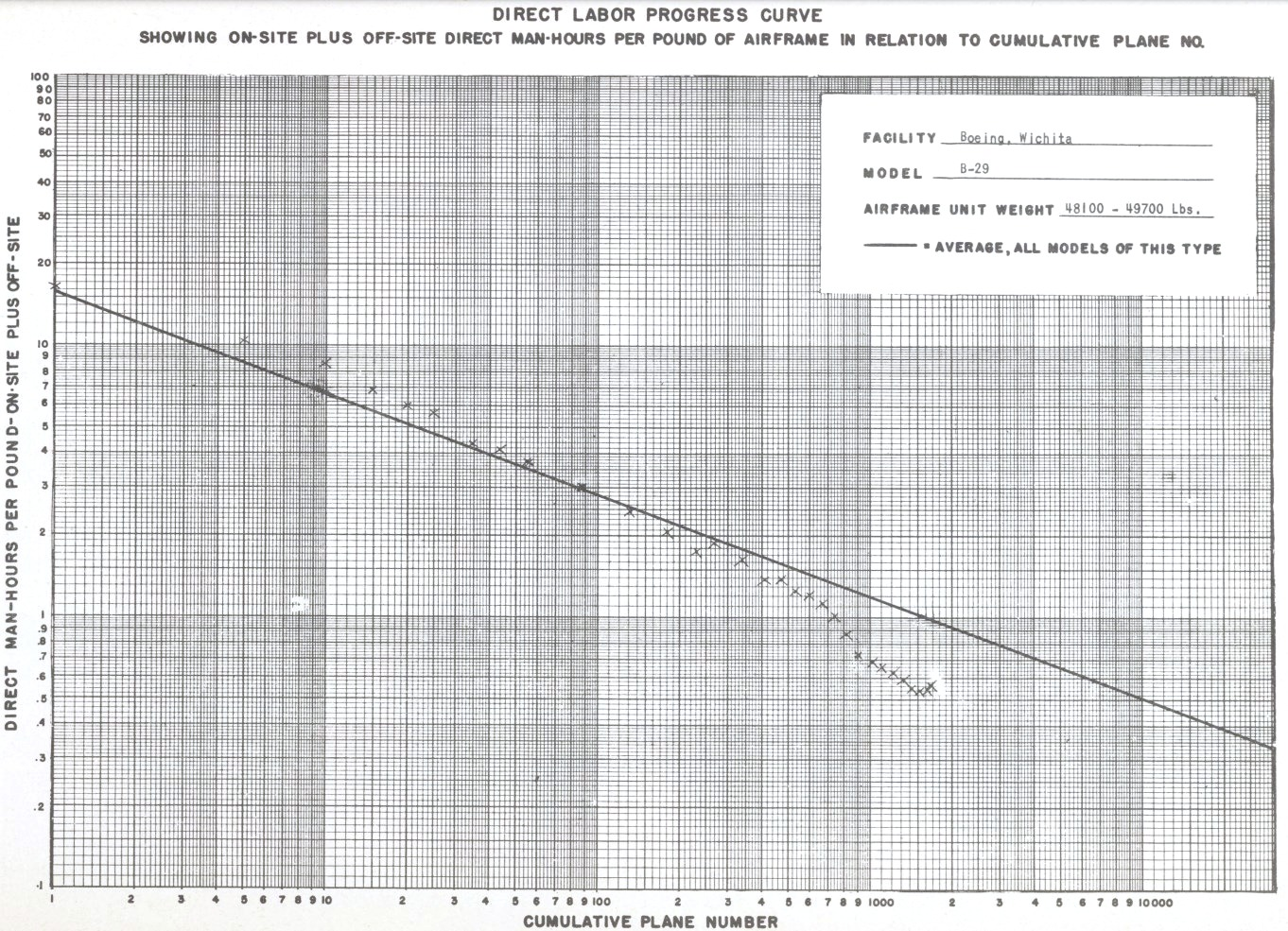
Learning curve of the production of B-29 airframes at the Boeing Wichita division during WWII

An example of a subject becoming more proficient at a task as they spend more time doing it. In this example, proficiency increases rapidly at first but at later stages there are diminishing returns. View source data.
An example of what the common (yet confusing) expression "steep learning curve" is referring to. The subject spends a great amount of time but does not see an increase in proficiency at first. View source data.

A learning curve is a graphical representation of the relationship between how proficient people are at a task and the amount of experience they have. Proficiency (measured on the vertical axis) usually increases with increased experience (the horizontal axis), that is to say, the more someone, groups, companies or industries perform a task, the better their performance at the task.

The common expression "a steep learning curve" is a misnomer suggesting that an activity is difficult to learn and that expending much effort does not increase proficiency by much, although a learning curve with a steep start actually represents rapid progress. In fact, the gradient of the curve has nothing to do with the overall difficulty of an activity, but expresses the expected rate of change of learning speed over time. An activity that it is easy to learn the basics of, but difficult to gain proficiency in, may be described as having "a steep learning curve".

The learning curve may refer to a specific task or a body of knowledge. Hermann Ebbinghaus first described the learning curve in 1885 in the field of the psychology of learning, although the name did not come into use until 1903. In 1936 Theodore Paul Wright described the effect of learning on production costs in the aircraft industry. This form, in which unit cost is plotted against total production, is sometimes called an experience curve, or Wright's law.

== In psychology ==
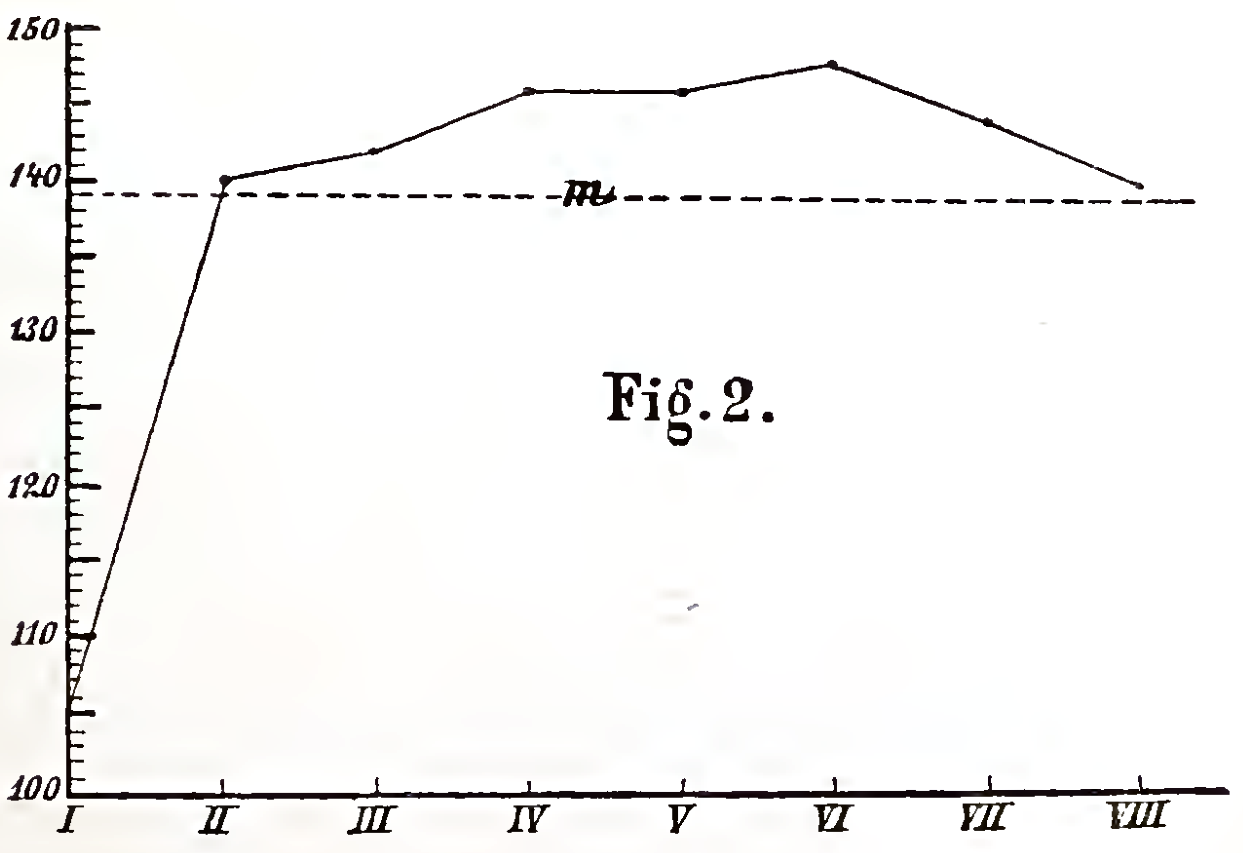
Figure 2 from Ebbinghaus' Über das Gedächtnis. Ebbinghaus ran a series of 92 tests. In each test, he gave the subject 8 blocks of 13 random syllables each, and plotted the average time taken for the subject to memorize the block.

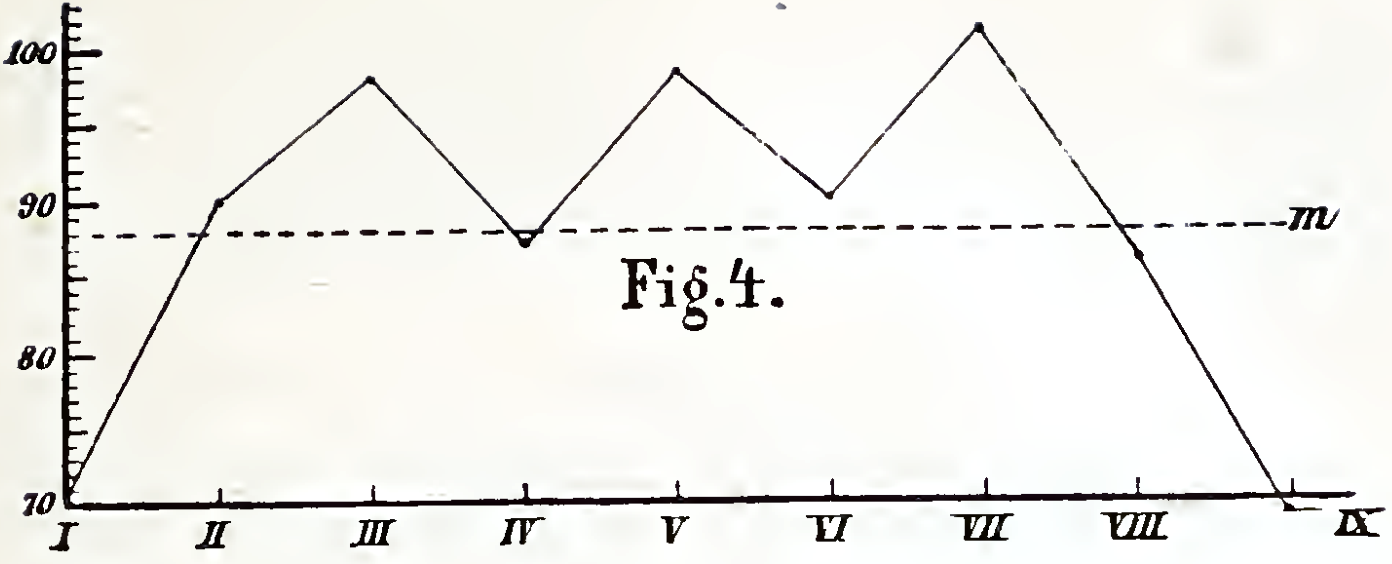
Figure 4 from Über das Gedächtnis. The same test with 9 blocks of 12 syllables each. This shows an oscillating pattern.

Hermann Ebbinghaus' memory tests, published in 1885, involved memorizing series of nonsense syllables, and recording the success over a number of trials. The translation does not use the term 'learning curve' — but he presents diagrams of learning against trial number. He also notes that the score can decrease, or even oscillate.

The first known use of the term 'learning curve' is from 1903: "Bryan and Harter (6) found in their study of the acquisition of the telegraphic language a learning curve which had the rapid rise at the beginning followed by a period of slower learning, and was thus convex to the vertical axis."

Psychologist Arthur Bills gave a more detailed description of learning curves in 1934. He also discussed the properties of different types of learning curves, such as negative acceleration, positive acceleration, plateaus, and ogive curves.

== In economics ==
=== History ===
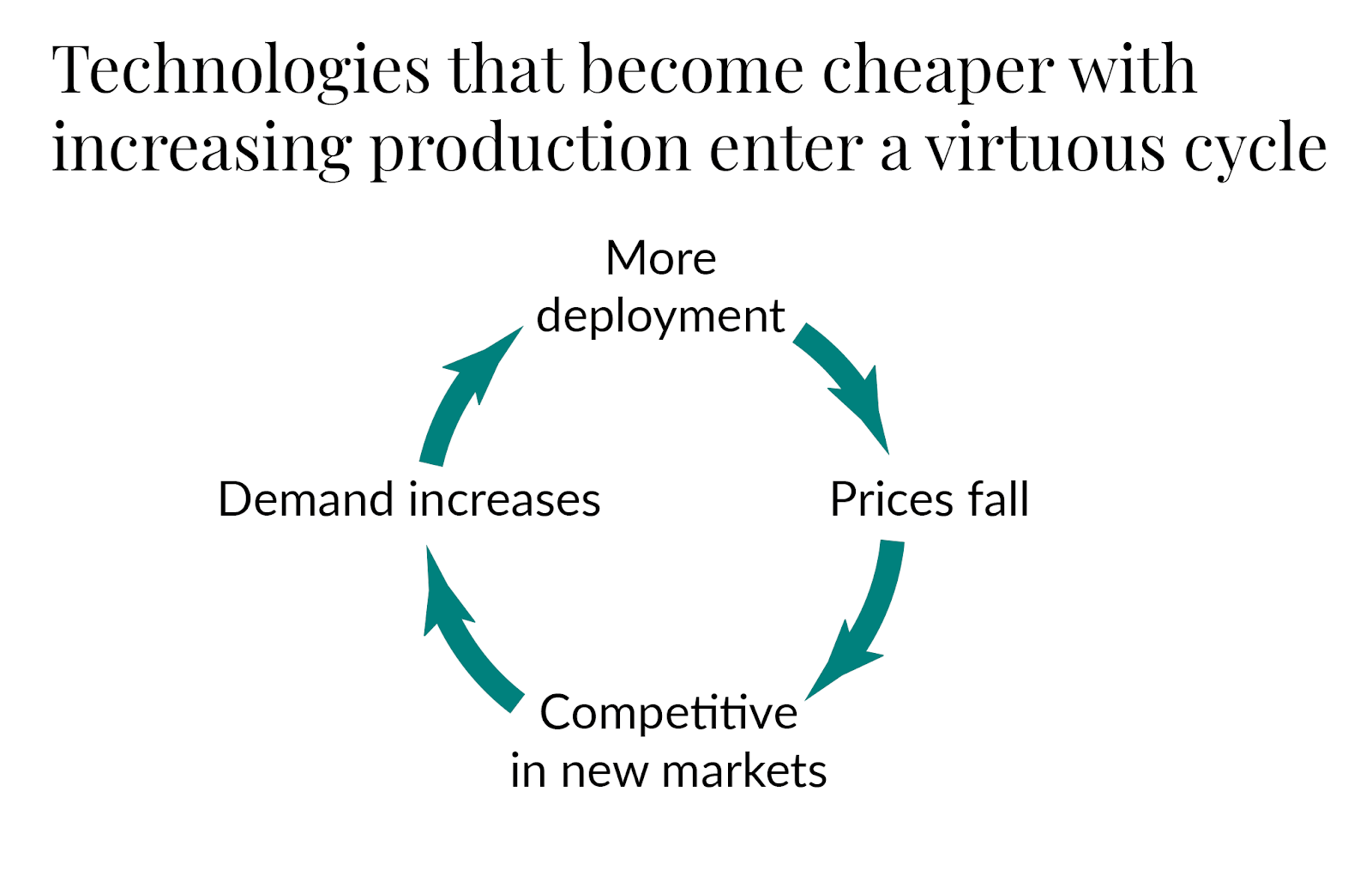

In 1936, Theodore Paul Wright described the effect of learning on production costs in the aircraft industry and proposed a mathematical model of the learning curve.

In 1952, the US Air Force published data on the learning curve in the airframe industry from 1940 to mid-1945. Specifically, they tabulated and plotted the direct man-hour cost of various products as a function of cumulative production. This formed the basis of many studies on learning curves in the 1950s.

In 1968 Bruce Henderson of the Boston Consulting Group (BCG) generalized the Unit Cost model pioneered by Wright, and specifically used a Power Law, which is sometimes called Henderson's Law. He named this particular version the experience curve. Research by BCG in the 1970s observed experience curve effects for various industries that ranged from 10 to 25 percent.

=== Models ===
The main learning curve models on a log-log plot. Wright, Plateau, Stanford-B, DeJong, S-curve.

The main statistical models for learning curves are as follows:

- Wright's model ("log-linear"): $y = Kx^n$, where
  - $y$ is the cost of the $x$-th unit,
  - $x$ is the total number of units made,
  - $K$ is the cost of the first unit made,
  - $n$ is the exponent measuring the strength of learning.
- Plateau model: $y = \max(Kx^n, K_0)$, where $K_0$ models the minimal cost achievable. In other words, the learning ceases after cost reaches a sufficiently low level.
- Stanford-B model: $y = K(x+B)^n$, where $B$ models worker's prior experience.
- DeJong's model: $y = K(M + (1-M)x^n)$, where $M$ models the fraction of production done by machines (assumed to be unable to learn, unlike a human worker).
- S-curve model: $y = K(M + (1-M)(x+B)^n)$, a combination of Stanford-B model and DeJong's model.

The key variable is the exponent $n$ measuring the strength of learning. It is usually expressed as $n = \log(\phi)/\log(2)$, where $\phi$ is the "learning rate". In words, it means that the unit cost decreases by $1-\phi$, for every doubling of total units made. Wright found that $\phi \approx 80\%$ in aircraft manufacturing, meaning that the unit cost decreases by 20% for every doubling of total units made.

=== Applications ===
The economic learning of productivity and efficiency generally follows the same kinds of experience curves and have interesting secondary effects. Efficiency and productivity improvement can be considered as whole organization or industry or economy learning processes, as well as for individuals. The general pattern is of first speeding up and then slowing down, as the practically achievable level of methodology improvement is reached. The effect of reducing local effort and resource use by learning improved methods often has the opposite latent effect on the next larger scale system, by facilitating its expansion, or economic growth, as discussed in the Jevons paradox in the 1880s and updated in the Khazzoom–Brookes Postulate in the 1980s.

A comprehensive understanding of the application of learning curve on managerial economics would provide plenty of benefits on strategic level. People could predict the appropriate timing of the introductions for new products and offering competitive pricing decisions, deciding investment levels by stimulate innovations on products and the selection of organizational design structures. Balachander and Srinivasan used to study a durable product and its pricing strategy on the principles of the learning curve. Based on the concepts that the growing experience in producing and selling a product would cause the decline of unit production cost, they found the potential best introductory price for this product. As for the problems of production management under the limitation of scarce resources, Liao observed that without including the effects of the learning curve on labor hours and machines hours, people might make incorrect managerial decisions. Demeester and Qi used the learning curve to study the transition between the old products' eliminating and new products' introduction. Their results indicated that the optimal switching time is determined by the characteristics of product and process, market factors, and the features of learning curve on this production. Konstantaras, Skouri, and Jaber applied the learning curve on demand forecasting and the economic order quantity. They found that the buyers obey to a learning curve, and this result is useful for decision-making on inventory management.

Learning curves have been used to model Moore's law in the semiconductor industry.

When wages are proportional to number of products made, workers may resist changing to a different post or having a new member on the team, since it would temporarily decrease productivity. Learning curves has been used to adjust for temporary dips so that workers are paid more for the same product while they are learning.

== Examples and mathematical modeling ==
A learning curve is a plot of proxy measures for implied learning (proficiency or progression toward a limit) with experience.

- The horizontal axis represents experience either directly as time (clock time, or the time spent on the activity), or can be related to time (a number of trials, or the total number of units produced).
- The vertical axis is a measure representing 'learning' or 'proficiency' or other proxy for "efficiency" or "productivity". It can either be increasing (for example, the score in a test), or decreasing (the time to complete a test).

For the performance of one person in a series of trials the curve can be erratic, with proficiency increasing, decreasing or leveling out in a plateau.

When the results of a large number of individual trials are averaged then a smooth curve results, which can often be described with a mathematical function.

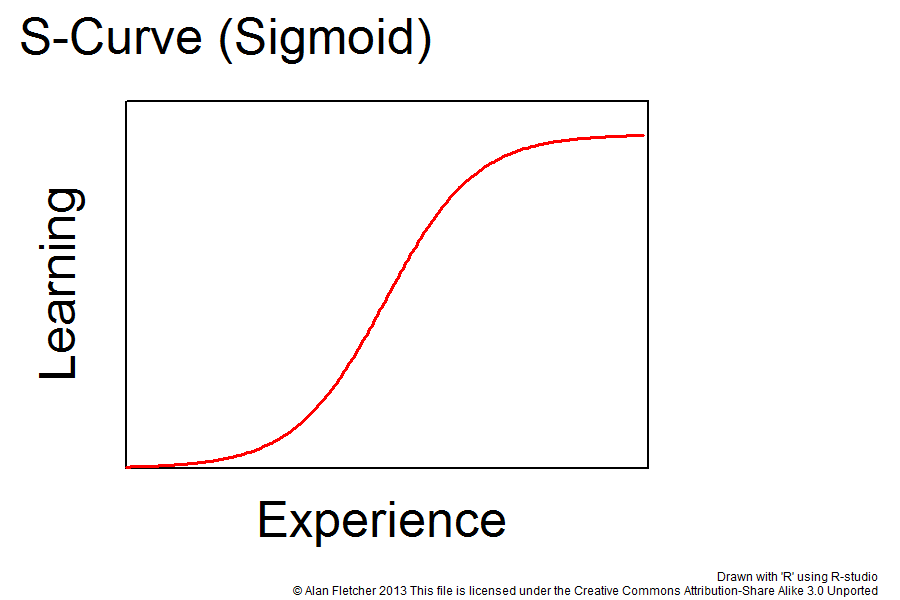
S-curve or sigmoid function

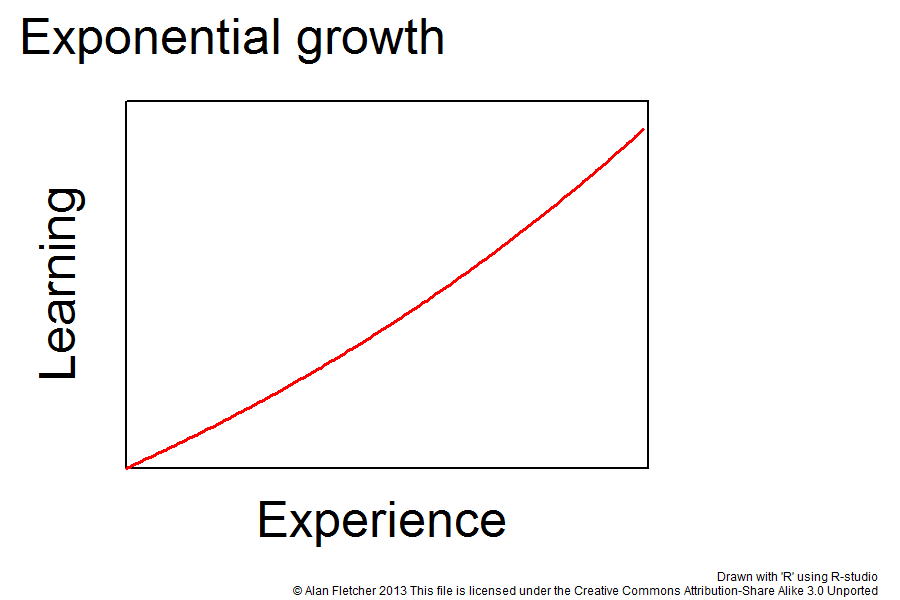
Exponential growth

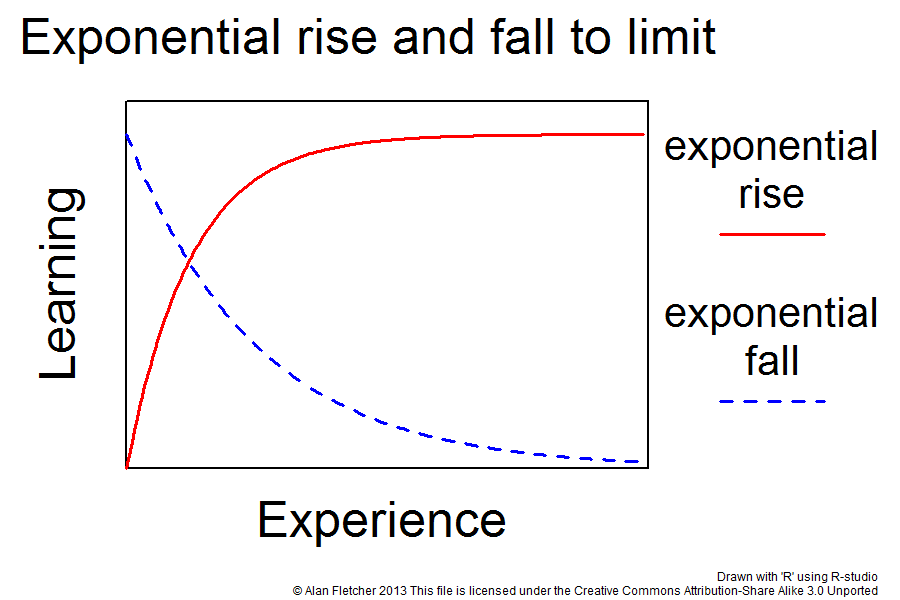
Exponential rise or fall to a limit

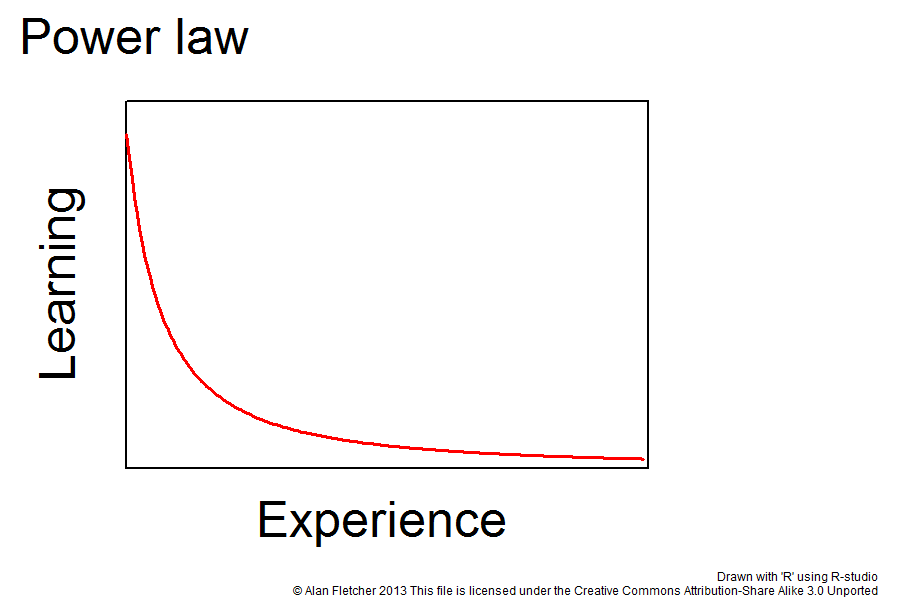
Power law

Several main functions have been used:

- The S-Curve or Sigmoid function is the idealized general form of all learning curves, with slowly accumulating small steps at first followed by larger steps and then successively smaller ones later, as the learning activity reaches its limit. That idealizes the normal progression from discovery of something to learn about followed to the limit of learning about it. The other shapes of learning curves (4, 5 & 6) show segments of S-curves without their full extents. In this case the improvement of proficiency starts slowly, then increases rapidly, and finally levels off.
- Exponential growth; the proficiency can increase without limit, as in Exponential growth
- Exponential rise or fall to a Limit; proficiency can exponentially approach a limit in a manner similar to that in which a capacitor charges or discharges (exponential decay) through a resistor. The increase in skill or retention of information may increase rapidly to its maximum rate during the initial attempts, and then gradually levels out, meaning that the subject's skill does not improve much with each later repetition, with less new knowledge gained over time.
- Power law; similar in appearance to an exponential decay function, and is almost always used for a decreasing performance metric, such as cost. It also has the property that if plotted as the logarithm of proficiency against the logarithm of experience the result is a straight line, and it is often presented that way.

The specific case of a plot of Unit Cost versus Total Production with a power law was named the experience curve: the mathematical function is sometimes called Henderson's Law. This form of learning curve is used extensively in industry for cost projections.

== In machine learning ==
Plots relating performance to experience are widely used in machine learning. Performance is the error rate or accuracy of the learning system, while experience may be the number of training examples used for learning or the number of iterations used in optimizing the system model parameters. The machine learning curve is useful for many purposes including comparing different algorithms, choosing model parameters during design, adjusting optimization to improve convergence, and determining the amount of data used for training.

== Broader interpretations ==
Learning curves are sometimes referred to as learning rates. This chart shows how the price of solar panels has decreased as more and more panels were installed. The price decreased at a rate of about 20% for each doubling of the amount of panels installed.

Initially introduced in educational and behavioral psychology, the term has acquired a broader interpretation over time, and expressions such as "experience curve", "improvement curve", "cost improvement curve", "progress curve", "progress function", "startup curve", "efficiency curve", and "learning rate" are often used interchangeably. In economics the subject is rates of "development", as development refers to a whole system learning process with varying rates of progression. Generally speaking all learning displays incremental change over time, but describes an "S" curve which has different appearances depending on the time scale of observation. It has now also become associated with the evolutionary theory of punctuated equilibrium and other kinds of revolutionary change in complex systems generally, relating to innovation, organizational behavior and the management of group learning, among other fields. These processes of rapidly emerging new form appear to take place by complex learning within the systems themselves, which when observable, display curves of changing rates that accelerate and decelerate.

== General learning limits ==
Learning curves, also called experience curves, relate to the much broader subject of natural limits for resources and technologies in general. Such limits generally present themselves as increasing complications that slow the learning of how to do things more efficiently, like the well-known limits of perfecting any process or product or to perfecting measurements. These practical experiences match the predictions of the second law of thermodynamics for the limits of waste reduction generally. Approaching limits of perfecting things to eliminate waste meets geometrically increasing effort to make progress, and provides an environmental measure of all factors seen and unseen changing the learning experience. Perfecting things becomes ever more difficult despite increasing effort despite continuing positive, if ever diminishing, results. The same kind of slowing progress due to complications in learning also appears in the limits of useful technologies and of profitable markets applying to product life cycle management and software development cycles). Remaining market segments or remaining potential efficiencies or efficiencies are found in successively less convenient forms.

Efficiency and development curves typically follow a two-phase process of first bigger steps corresponding to finding things easier, followed by smaller steps of finding things more difficult. It reflects bursts of learning following breakthroughs that make learning easier followed by meeting constraints that make learning ever harder, perhaps toward a point of cessation.

- Natural Limits: One of the key studies in the area concerns diminishing returns on investments generally, either physical or financial, pointing to whole system limits for resource development or other efforts. The most studied of these may be Energy Return on Energy Invested or EROEI, discussed at length in an Encyclopedia of the Earth article and in an OilDrum article and series also referred to as Hubert curves. The energy needed to produce energy is a measure of our difficulty in learning how to make remaining energy resources useful in relation to the effort expended. Energy returns on energy invested have been in continual decline for some time, caused by natural resource limits and increasing investment. Energy is both nature's and our own principal resource for making things happen. The point of diminishing returns is when increasing investment makes the resource more expensive. As natural limits are approached, easily used sources are exhausted and ones with more complications need to be used instead. As an environmental signal persistently diminishing EROI indicates an approach of whole system limits in our ability to make things happen.
- Useful Natural Limits: EROEI measures the return on invested effort as a ratio of R/I or learning progress. The inverse I/R measures learning difficulty. The simple difference is that if R approaches zero R/I will too, but I/R will approach infinity. When complications emerge to limit learning progress the limit of useful returns, uR, is approached and R-uR approaches zero. The difficulty of useful learning I/(R-uR) approaches infinity as increasingly difficult tasks make the effort unproductive. That point is approached as a vertical asymptote, at a particular point in time, that can be delayed only by unsustainable effort. It defines a point at which enough investment has been made and the task is done, usually planned to be the same as when the task is complete. For unplanned tasks it may be either foreseen or discovered by surprise. The usefulness measure, uR, is affected by the complexity of environmental responses that can only be measured when they occur unless they are foreseen.

== In culture ==
=== "Steep learning curve" ===
The expression "steep learning curve" is used with opposite meanings. Most sources, including the Oxford Dictionary of English, the American Heritage Dictionary of the English Language, and Merriam-Webster's Collegiate Dictionary, define a learning curve as the rate at which skill is acquired, so a steep increase would mean a quick increment of skill. However, the term is often used in common English with the meaning of a difficult initial learning process.

The common English usage aligns with a metaphorical interpretation of the learning curve as a hill to climb. (A steeper hill is initially hard, while a gentle slope is less strainful, though sometimes rather tedious. Accordingly, the shape of the curve (hill) may not indicate the total amount of work required. Instead, it can be understood as a matter of preference related to ambition, personality and learning style.)

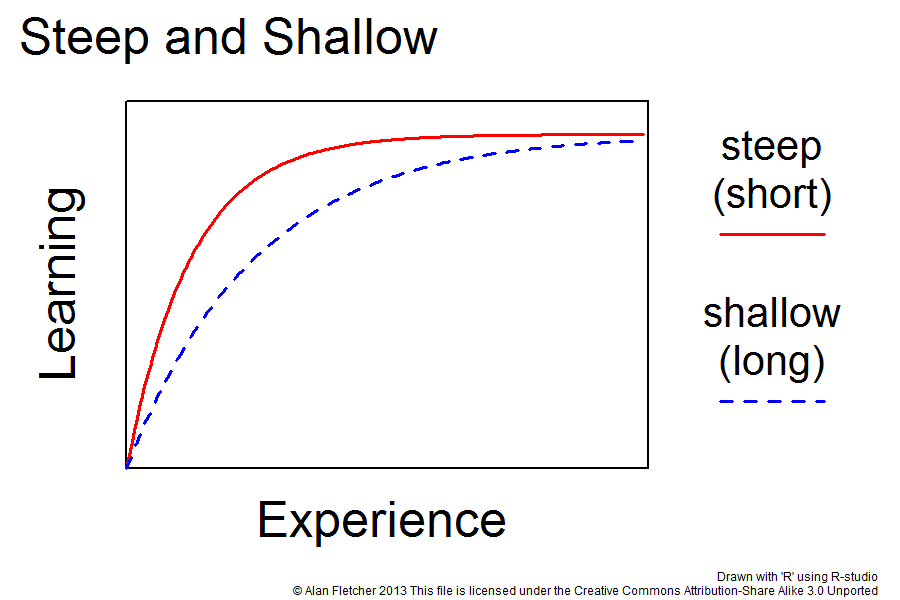
Short and long learning curves

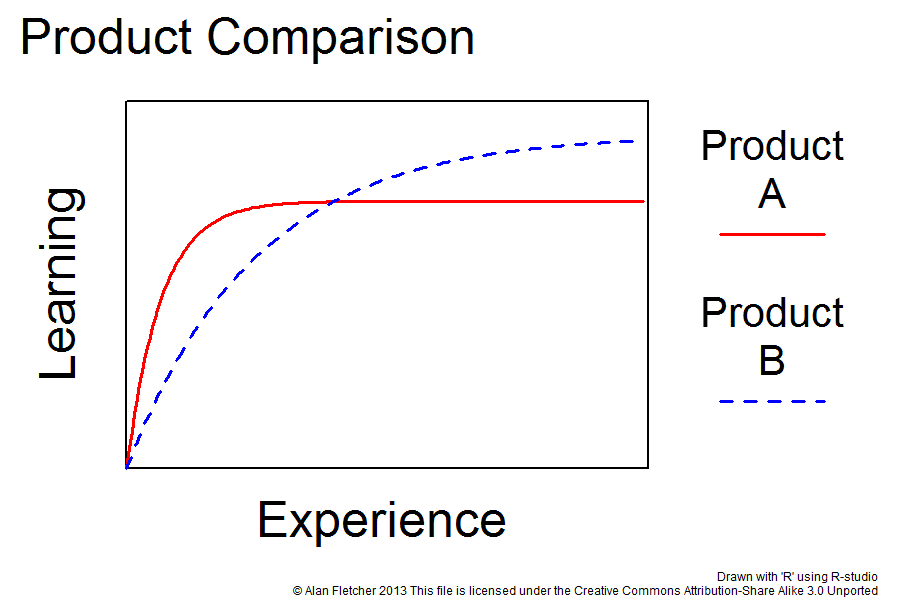
Product A has lower functionality and a short learning curve. Product B has greater functionality but takes longer to learn.

The term learning curve with meanings of easy and difficult can be described with adjectives like short and long rather than shallow and steep. If two products have similar functionality then the one with a "steep" curve is probably better, because it can be learned in a shorter time. On the other hand, if two products have different functionality, then one with a short curve (a short time to learn) and limited functionality may not be as good as one with a long curve (a long time to learn) and greater functionality.

For example, the Windows program Notepad is extremely simple to learn, but offers little after this. At the other extreme is the UNIX terminal editor vi or Vim, which is difficult to learn, but offers a wide array of features after the user has learned how to use it.

=== "On a steep learning curve" ===
Ben Zimmer discusses the use of the term "on a steep learning curve" in Downton Abbey, a television series set in the early 20th century, concentrating mainly on whether use of the term is an anachronism. "Matthew Crawley, the presumptive heir of Downton Abbey and now the co-owner of the estate, says, 'I've been on a steep learning curve since arriving at Downton.' By this he means that he has had a difficult time learning the ways of Downton, but people did not start talking that way until the 1970s."

Zimmer also comments that the popular use of steep as difficult is a reversal of the technical meaning. He identifies the first use of steep learning curve as 1973, and the arduous interpretation as 1978.

=== Difficulty curves in video games ===
The idea of learning curves is often translated into video game gameplay as a "difficulty curve", which described how hard the game may get as the player progresses through the game and requiring the player to either become more proficient with the game, gain better understanding of the game's mechanics, and/or spend time "grinding" to improve their characters. Establishing the right difficulty curve is part of achieving the game balance within a title. As with learning curves in educational settings, difficulty curves can have multitudes of shapes, and games may frequently provide various levels of difficulty that change the shape of this curve relative to its default to make the game harder or easier. Optimally the difficulty of a video game increases in correspondence with players ability. Games must neither be too challenging nor too undemanding nor too fortuitous. The players will continue playing as long as a game is perceived to be winnable. This is therefore referred to as the illusion of winnability. To generate an illusion of winnability games can include, internal value (a sense of moving towards a goal and being rewarded for it) driven by conflict which can be generated by an antagonistic environment and story driven suspense in the form of world building. The latter is not pivotal to progressing in a game. Game designers may also make changes in gameplay by, for instance, limiting resources. One perspective is that if players are not tricked to believe that the video game world is real - if the world does not feel vibrant - then there is no point in creating the game.

== See also ==
- Bushnell's Law
- Forgetting curve
- Learning speed
- Labor productivity
- Learning-by-doing (economics)
- Population growth
- Trial and error
