= Tools for Thought =

Tools for Thought: The History and Future of Mind-Expanding Technology is a work of "retrospective futurism" in which Smart Mobs author Howard Rheingold looked at the history of computing and then attempted to predict what the networked world might look like in the mid-1990s. The book covers the groundbreaking work of thinkers like Alan Turing, John von Neumann, and J.C.R. Licklider, as well as Xerox PARC, Apple Computer, and Microsoft (when Microsoft was "aiming for the hundred-million-dollar category"). Rheingold wrote that the impetus behind Tools for Thought was to understand where "mind-amplifying technology" was going by understanding where it came from.
