= Bill Landreth =

American hacker

William Troy Landreth (born April 5, 1963) is an American hacker notable for his cracking activities during the early 1980s within a cracking club called "The Inner Circle". MySpace cofounder, Tom Anderson (Lord Flathead) was an associate. In 1984, Landreth was convicted of hacking computer systems, and accessing NASA and Department of Defense computer data. In 1986, he disappeared (from which he re-appeared a year later). Landreth's and Howard Rheingold's book, Out of the Inner Circle: A Hacker's Guide to Computer Security, published in 1986, is considered a best-seller.

In 1989, Landreth was homeless.

As of 2016 he was still homeless.

== Works ==
- Bill Landreth; Howard Rheingold. Out of the Inner Circle: A Hacker's Guide to Computer Security (Microsoft Press, 1985) ISBN 0-914845-36-5

== See also ==
- Terry A. Davis
