= AlterEgo =

Speech device

AlterEgo is a proprietary wearable silent speech output-input device developed by MIT Media Lab. The device is attached around the head, neck and jawline and translates muscular and neural activity into words on a computer without vocalization.

== Description ==
The device consists of seven small electrodes that attach at various points around the jawline and mouth to monitor electrical inputs to the muscles used for speech.

The device is a form of peripheral neural-computer interface. The device primarily reads electrical activity from neural signals in the speech musculature and not from the brain directly to preserve a user's privacy. This means that the device does not capture speech imagery, but captures intended silent speech where the muscles are very subtly activated.

The device uses machine learning and statistical models to predict a user's intended speech.

== Background ==
AlterEgo was designed by Arnav Kapur, a graduate student at MIT, and became public in 2018. The device was designed to help people with speech disabilities. In 2018, the device was presented at the Conference on Intelligent User Interfaces where the research team reported a 92% median word-accuracy rate.

== See also ==
- Silent speech interface
- Imagined speech / Subvocalization
- Intrapersonal communication
