= Augmented learning =

Learning technique

Augmented learning is an on-demand learning technique where the environment adapts to the learner. By providing remediation on-demand, learners can gain greater understanding of a topic while stimulating discovery and learning. Technologies incorporating rich media and interaction have demonstrated the educational potential that scholars, teachers and students are embracing. Instead of focusing on memorization, the learner experiences an adaptive learning experience based upon the current context. The augmented content can be dynamically tailored to the learner's natural environment by displaying text, images, video or even playing audio (music or speech). This additional information is commonly shown in a pop-up window for computer-based environments.

Most implementations of augmented learning are forms of e-learning. In desktop computing environments, the learner receives supplemental, contextual information through an on-screen, pop-up window, toolbar or sidebar. As the user navigates a website, e-mail or document, the learner associates the supplemental information with the key text selected by a mouse, touch or other input device. In mobile environments, augmented learning has also been deployed on tablets and smartphones.

Augmented learning is often used by corporate learning and development providers to teach innovative thinking and leadership skills by emphasizing "learning-by-doing". Participants are required to apply the skills gained from e-learning platforms to real life examples. Data is used to create a personalized learning program for each participant, providing supplemental information and remediation.

Augmented learning is closely related to augmented intelligence (intelligence amplification) and augmented reality. Augmented intelligence applies information processing capabilities to extend the processing capabilities of the human mind through distributed cognition. Augmented intelligence provides extra support for autonomous intelligence and has a long history of success. Mechanical and electronic devices that function as augmented intelligence range from the abacus, calculator, personal computers and smart phones. Software with augmented intelligence provide supplemental information that is related to the context of the user. When an individual's name appears on the screen, a pop-up window could display a person's organizational affiliation, contact information and most recent interactions.

In mobile reality systems, the annotation may appear on the learner's individual "heads-up display" or through headphones for audio instruction. For example, apps for Google Glasses can provide video tutorials and interactive click-throughs, .

Foreign language educators are also beginning to incorporate augmented learning techniques to traditional paper-and-pen-based exercises. For example, augmented information is presented near the primary subject matter, allowing the learner to learn how to write glyphs while understanding the meaning of the underlying characters. See Understanding language, below.

== Just-in-time understanding and learning ==
Augmentation tools can help learners understand issues, acquire relevant information and solve complex issues by presenting supplementary information at the time of need or "on demand." This contrasts with methods of associative learning, including rote learning, classical conditioning and observational learning, where the learning is performed in advance of the learner's need to recall or apply what has been learned.

Snyder and Wilson assert that just-in-time learning is not sufficient. Long-term learning demands continuous training should be individualized and built upon individual competencies and strengths.

== Understanding language ==
Augmented learning tools have been useful for learners to gain a better understanding of words or to understand a foreign language. The interactive, dynamic nature of these on-demand language assistants can provide definitions, sample sentences and even audible pronunciations. When sentences or blocks of text are selected, the words are read aloud while the user follows along with the native text or phonetics. Speech rate control can tailor the text-to-speech (TTS) to keep pace with the learner's comprehension.

The use of augmented learning has already been implemented in schools across the world. New technology is constantly being developed to hone the skills of students both in and out of the classroom. People other than students can also use these resources to learn or develop their own language skills on their own time and in the language they choose to learn. Websites such as Rosetta Stone have been around for a number of years and allow for people of all ages from all around the world to learn a new language. Many of these applications and websites are pay to use. One application that allows for free learning is Duolingo that allows for both free learning and paid learning. Augmented learning allows for real time answers to student's quizzes and tests that provide feedback quicker than in class discussion. This type of feedback also allows for students to move through the class at their own pace. If an answer is correct the student may move on to new and more challenging questions. While if the answer is incorrect the student may be prompted to study more and are given more practice questions based on the incorrect answer. In an in-person classroom students have to move at the pace of the rest of the class which may cause students to not gain a full understanding of the content and leave many struggling to keep up. The use of it also has shown more correct answers up to 95% of the time for their reading.

Most forms of augmented learning can be found on the internet through websites apps on your mobile device. This allows for students and regular people that are interested in learning a new language the ease of access not found in a standard textbook. This also allows for learning where every you may go without the restriction a classroom would hold. These applications also allow for more direct one on one instruction that would not be found in a classroom of twenty plus students. Students are able to submit an answer and get an immediate score back for their work. The downside of augmented learning for language learning is that it may end up putting language teachers out of the job. As these programs develop, they may prove to be far more effective at teaching students than a physical teacher ever could be. This would put thousands of language teachers across the globe out of the job and force them in fields they may not enjoy as much.

== Current Challenges ==
Even with augmented reality (AR)'s enormous educational potential, a number of issues still need to be fixed. Koumpouros (2024) points out that while augmented reality (AR) has the potential to revolutionize teaching methods, cost and accessibility concerns are major obstacles to its adoption. The research indicates that "while AR technology offers many opportunities for immersive learning, educational institutions must carefully consider costs of implementation and technical infrastructure requirements." There are issues with teacher training, technical support, and creating excellent instructional materials that make good use of augmented reality in addition to finance concerns.

Recent studies indicate that there are effective approaches to use augmented reality in the classroom. According to Lampropoulos et al. (2022), for augmented reality (AR) integration to be successful,

1. Careful alignment with curriculum objectives
2. Proper infrastructure and technological assistance
3. Training of teachers and professional growth
4. Assessment of learning outcomes on a regular basis

These strategies must be implemented systematically and with full institutional support to ensure successful adoption and sustainable use of augmented reality (AR) technology in educational settings.

Other problems associated with augmented language learning is the extensive use of technology with no face-to-face learning. Students may suffer from fatigue from sitting at a computer for hours a day which would affect their learning and development in the class. Social isolation from online language learning may also occur. It would affect students' mental health not having regular face to face interaction with other students. While this may kind of learning may help some students it could have severely harmful effects on others. Tech problems are also an everyday problem we all struggle with. Issues with the website or application may cause students to miss assignments or an online class and harm their grade because of an issue they have no control over. Issues like this presented themselves fully when the COVID-19 pandemic began and showed that many students would have technology issues leaving them stranded in their learning. The use of augmented learning poses many pros and cons that may entice schools to adapt and use the programs provided to a greater extent. As these programs grow and develop, more and more students will become more efficient in the classroom and any real-world situations where they can use the information gained from augmented learning to their advantage.

== Understanding Science ==
AR technology has impacted the way STEM is taught. It has started using webcams, making them read a certain marker label, then an object where the label would be comes up on the screen. Developers are continuing to gather information on how AR (augmented reality) could assume its part in the learning environment. Over the past few years, there have been technologies added to the classroom such as computers, laptops, projectors, and white boards.

The significance of customized learning experiences has been brought to light by recent advancements in augmented reality educational applications. According to Lampropoulos et al.'s (2022) comprehensive evaluation of 670 studies, gamification components added to AR technology significantly boost student enthusiasm and engagement. Their study shows that "personalized AR experiences create more engaging learning environments, leading to improved knowledge academic performance." By accommodating different learning styles and speeds, these individualized experiences enable students to advance at their own speed while retaining a high level of motivation and interest in the material.

Students are also now able to take notes without having to listening to what the teacher is saying, but instead writing what they typed on the projector. The notes can be more thorough and to the point, rather than an entire explanation. With the help of AR we can also see pictures on the board showing students the space in between certain objects such as planets or atoms.

In modern times, augmented learning can help students understand complex topics with more success than the traditional model. One such example of a complex scientific topic benefiting from a virtual environment is continuous distillation. This topic is usually challenging for students to grasp as a diagram can only show states rather than a continuous change. Practical experiments are also less effective as the distillation process cannot be seen through the vessel it occurs in.

A study on augmented learning with the topic of continuous distillation states, "Overall, the authors garnered that the use of virtual tools helps enhance and enrich the students' learning by increasing their understanding of key concepts and promotes interest in the subject matter." This conclusion was made because the test scores of students with the augmented learning method performed significantly better than the students who did not experience the augmented learning method. This is caused by the augmented learning application's ability to look inside the vessel the process takes place in throughout each step of the process. When given a complex topic that is hard to visualize, augmented learning can provide a view to a student that aids in their learning. It was also found to be beneficial when the students could engage with this medium in their own time rather than it being accessible only within the classroom, as the application was always available to the students through their phone. As the level of basic technology rises, it becomes more feasible for teachers to shift their focus away from creating the learning environment and instead supplementing the learning tools.

Outside of the classroom, augmented learning is important for informal STEM (Science, Technology, Engineering and Math) education. This form of education can be seen within museums, science centers, and anywhere outside the classroom. With widespread use of smart devices, augmented reality is feasible to incorporate into every person's education. Pokémon GO, the 2016 hit mobile game, actively pushed their augmented reality features. This was the first example of widespread use of augmented reality that opened over 750 million people to the idea of the virtual world interacting with our own. The STEM field began to take notice and implemented this innovative technology into museum exhibits and other informal learning environments.

An investigation of seventeen published papers about augmented learning in informal settings found that sixteen of these papers were based on scientific fields. This is understandable when the common informal learning environment is museums that are commonly focused around STEM. Augmented learning exhibits found that they could engage a younger demographic easier than the practically demonstrated exhibits. Augmented learning for scientific purposes outside the classroom is widespread and accessible in the modern day.

Furthermore, augmented learning research is mostly centered around how it affects the scientific field. Papers published between 2013 and 2018, the most common topics examined were mobile and e-learning environments. The most common subject discussed within these papers is science education. This makes sense as the field of science is directly correlated with augmented learning methods, such as easy access to technology and virtual environments.

Scientific education is an especially easy to implement field for augmented learning. Many scientific topics are challenging to visualize with still images or in person demonstrations, but with modern tools the experience is improved. The study on continuous distillation proves the efficacy of a virtual environment that can provide additional context, even over a practical demonstration. The adoption of higher technology from the public, especially when the students are the main users of this technology outside the classroom, leads to the methods using it to be more impactful to their learning experience.

== Making learning fun ==
One researcher has suggested that handheld devices like cell phones and portable game machines (Game Boy, PlayStation Portable) can make an impact on learning. These mobile devices excel in their portability, context sensitivity, connectivity and ubiquity. By incorporating social dynamics in a real-world context, learning games can create compelling environments for learners.

At the Allard Pierson Museum in Amsterdam, visitors view information on-demand at the "A Future for the Past" exhibit. In a virtual reconstruction of Satricum and the Forum Romanum, users can call up information that is overlaid on room-sized photos and other images. The museum uses both stationary displays and mobile computers to allow users to view translucent images and information keyed to their specific interest.

English Learning

Learning English is often difficult, especially for younger age groups due to retention and learning capabilities. Using technology can help make the learning process easier. Nowadays, one can listen to the pronunciation, look up spelling, and all sorts of things to help better a student's education.

In more recent years, learning English has been made much easier through the use of Artificial Intelligence and Virtual Reality technology. These technologies have allowed users to access language learning in methods not available previously, eliminating the need for a human tutor, and specialized institutional education. For a majority of these technologies being developed, English has been the focus, as it is a major lingua franca. However, these projects are being expanded to include major languages, minor languages, and even fictional languages such as 'Klingon' from the series Star Trek in the popular app Duolingo.

A company known as 'Speaksy Labs' introduced their app 'Speak' which allows the user to be connected with a personal, AI tutor. With more popularized apps such as Duolingo, the user was only able to practice writing, reading, and basic speech. Starting with Speak, user's are able to have full on conversation, eliminating the need to find a personal human tutor. Studies done on English learning apps suggests that the design of these Artificial Intelligence apps are boosting user's English skills, making them a valuable resource for those trying to learn the language. The Artificial Intelligence can be trained to give the user specific feedback, including pronunciation, accent, and tone.

Virtual Reality is another effective tool for English learning through its virtual environments, and high level of interaction. Studies have shown that activities that require movement help the users understand language more, especially with younger audiences. Since these virtual environments are boundless, they have access to many resources that can be provided in teaching language lessons. For example, you could hold an apple in a Virtual Reality setting and the word 'apple' can be said so that the user correlates the word with the object. Research conclusions suggest that most children obtain higher scores and satisfaction than those who don't use Virtual Reality technology for their learning. Virtual environments allow the students to see places they may not have visiting before, eliminating the need for travel costs.

A case study into the 'Elsa Speak' app showed similar results as to what was previously shared. In higher learning, the study found that students gained a boost in their English comprehension, allowing them to speak, write, and read the language more efficiently . Now, the Elsa Speak app and various counterparts are breaking into different languages, appealing to groups across the world.

Application of technology in college

With the expansion of the uses of technology students are able to learn in all sorts of matters. For the most part, college students nowadays have classes, assignments, homework, and projects online via different websites and turn them in via those websites. And now, teachers have found a practical use for some new technology within the classrooms. For example, schools nowadays have pieces of technology to help classes. Some school in medical schools a giant tablet the size of a table and use it to show bones, blood vessels, veins, and other parts of the body. In other colleges with similar programs they have games that they use in specific class subjects. Students who used this technology in the classroom tend to also have better study habits as well as better motivation to complete classwork

High School and College education departments have started relying on forms of play to better understand class material. Quiz games, questionnaires, and team strategy games have been implemented to better help students understand class material. These technologies are also used to determine attendance which can be part of a students grade, by using the questionnaires to determine who was in class on a particular day. Even in higher education, research has found that learning through play keeps students involved in the material. In larger lecture halls, questionnaires are more prevalent, while team focused games are used in smaller class settings. In addition, specialized software allow students to present ideas in more effective ways. Some users are able to make their own websites, interactive portfolios, or just make simple PowerPoints. These various methods of learning engage the students in the class, while effectively preparing them better through exposure to the material in different ways.

== Is augmentation really "learning"? ==
Critics may see learning augmentation as a crutch that precludes memorization; similar arguments have been made about using calculators in the past. Just as rote learning is also not a substitute for understanding, augmented learning is simply another faculty for helping learners recall, present and process information.

Current research suggests that even unconscious visual learning can be effective. Visual stimuli, rendered in flashes of information, showed signs of learning even when the human adult subjects were unaware of the stimulus or reward contingencies.

One way to look at augmentation is whether the process leads to improvement in terms of signal to noise ratio for the individual learner. Diverse predispositions among varied learners means there can be great disparity in signal processing by different learners for any one particular instruction method.

Augmented and virtual reality in classrooms can be used as tools for teachers and educators around the world. AR can be used to improve student understanding of complex or invisible structures. AR and VR are capable of introducing children to new concepts in engaging ways. Not only do these realities help children learn, but they also help researchers identify what specific traits aid or hinder a child's learning capabilities.

These mediums for education include the ability to perform experiments virtually rather than in-person due to them proposing risk or health concerns. One study conducted was focused on the understanding of electromagnetism; In comparison to a non-AR environment, AR proved to increase the students' ability to visualize structural phenomena, reduced cognitive load, and improved motivation and self-confidence. However, this seems to only be the case for physical experiences, and there has not been anything to prove AR's dominance in a person's understanding of theoretical concepts. It is for this reason that AR will not take over classrooms entirely but will be a great advancement in children's understanding of STEM concepts.

It is important to remember that this is still an under-researched and relatively new technology for schools to implement. The technology that is used for creating AR experiences dates back to 1990, however, it was not widely used for educational purposes until around 2010. There is a lot that can be done to improve how AR is used in educational settings. It is also to be noted what types of studies were conducted. A large portion of the research documented is narrative-based and qualitative literature reviews, however, some suggest that it would be more accurate and credible to perform meta-analyses. A meta-analysis is in short, a way of gathering lots of individual research experiments and studying them to make more predictions on what the information tells us. This will provide a more valid representation of data found due to the sheer number of studies that were incorporated, along with the studies differing in their research methods, rather than the findings of just one case.

Through the use of 3D VLE's, AR allows people to travel to any place that they like in seconds that would otherwise be either expensive or impossible to get to. This means that a person can be anywhere in the world and immerse themselves in the culture of the place that they travel to. AR makes travelling and studying phenomena more interactive and entices us to keep using it because of its easy access.

While AR is helpful in classrooms, it is found that informal learning settings, outside of the classroom, have a higher impact on a student's learning. There has not yet been a study with a large enough sample size to compare how AR effects learning in these informal settings, but as stated in the second paragraph of this sub-section, even unconsciously, people are able to learn through AR with no stimulus or reward.

The group that AR has the most influential benefit on is Bachelor or equivalent level. It is believed that AR is less effective for younger children because of the complexity of operation and the overload of information. The study also backs up the previous claim that AR has a greater effect on individuals in engineering, manufacturing, and construction fields, and proves that social science understanding is not aided.

== Augmented learning in education ==
Augmented learning reveals applications not only to students, but their parents; online tools such as mobile games offers insight to parents about their children's learning experience. Furthermore, AR has brought a new way of learning to young children to have the ability to articulate words. By using so-called marker labels in books that are read by a tablet, pictures appear on the screen along with audio narration for enhanced reading.

== Conclusion ==
The use of augmented reality (AR) in the classroom signifies a dramatic change in teaching strategies. More interactive and experiential learning opportunities are made possible by augmented reality (AR) technology, which radically alters how students interact with course materials, according to Koumpouros (2024). As a result of this shift, educators must modify their pedagogical approaches and create fresh approaches to support AR-enhanced learning. This transformation requires a fundamental rethinking of traditional teaching methods and assessment strategies to fully leverage the potential of AR technology in education.

== See also ==
- Electronic learning
- Evidence-based learning
- Intelligence amplification

== Sources ==
- Karacapilidis, Nikos (2009). Solutions and Innovations in Web-Based Technologies for Augmented Learning: Improved Platforms, Tools, and Applications. PA: IGI Global. ISBN 1-60566-238-0, ISBN 978-1-60566-238-1
- Milne, Andre J. (1999). Shaping the Future of Technology-Augmented Learning Environments: Report on a Planning Charrette at Stanford University. https://web.archive.org/web/20100708025551/http://www-cdr.stanford.edu/~amilne/Publish/SCUP-34_Abstract.PDF
