= Bushnell's Law =

Game design principle

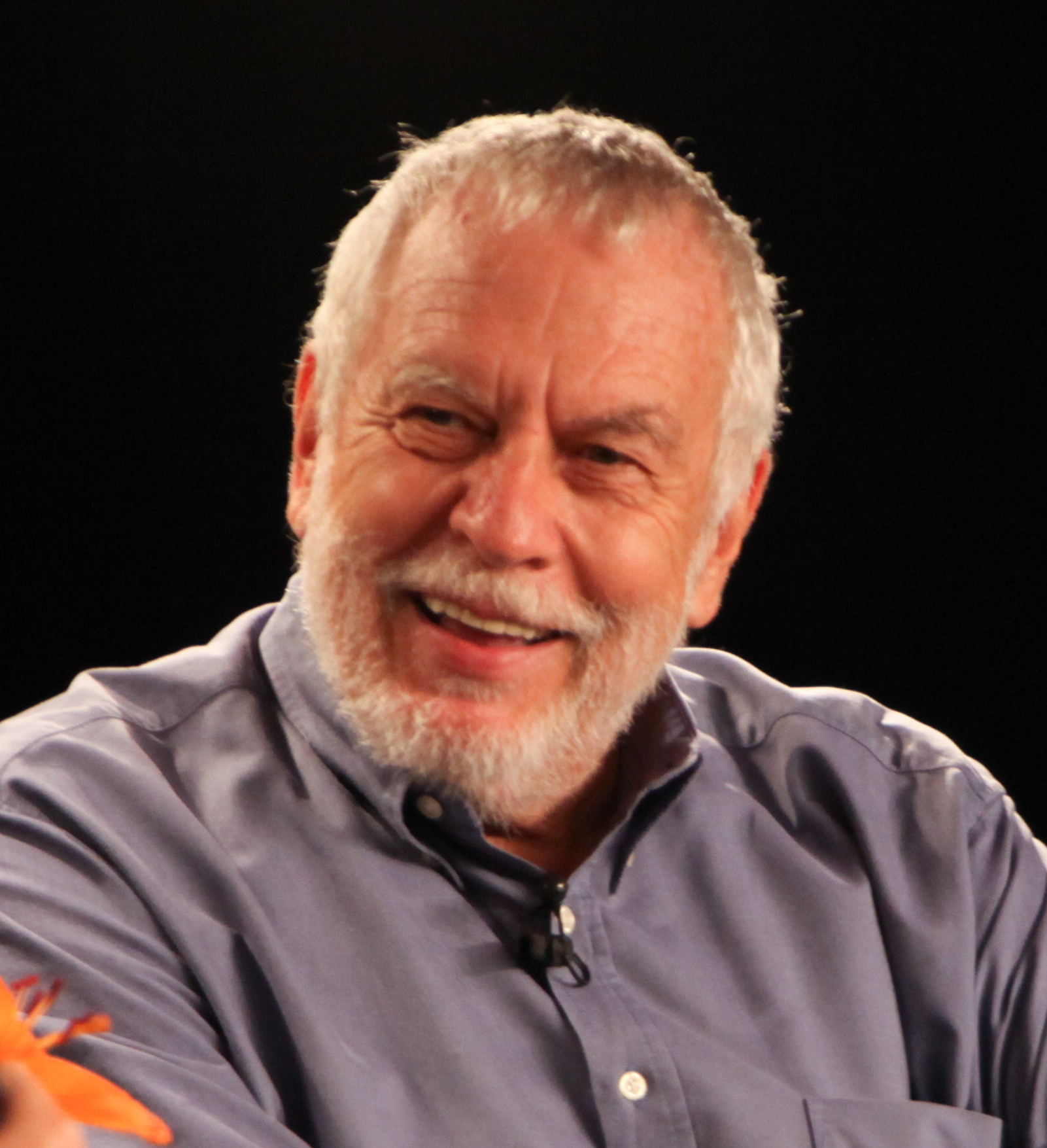
Nolan Bushnell in 2013

Bushnell's Law or Nolan's Law is an aphorism often attributed to Atari founder Nolan Bushnell, on the subject of video game design:

All the best games are easy to learn and difficult to master. They should reward the first quarter and the hundredth.

Bushnell came up with the concept based on his experience with his first game Computer Space in 1971. Its controls were based on four otherwise equivalent-looking buttons but with different functions, and Bushnell found that this had confused players that were trying to learn the game due to their lack of familiarity with these types of controls. Bushnell kept this in mind in designing their future games, such as in Pong and Asteroids, to keep the controls simple and easy to grasp while maintaining challenging gameplay. The concept is also similar to a philosophy developed by George Parker, the founder of board game publisher Parker Brothers. Parker had said that "Each game must have an exciting, relevant theme and be easy enough for most people to understand. Finally, each game should be so sturdy that it could be played time and again, without wearing out."

Video game designer Rob Pardo said while executive vice president of game design at Blizzard Entertainment, a company known for its multiplayer games, that the design objective he pushed for was closer to "Easy to learn and almost impossible to master."

== See also ==
- Learning curve
