= The Virtual Community =

Book about the history and sociology of online communities

- Author: Howard Rheingold
- Publication date: 1993
- ISBN: 9780262291415

The Virtual Community is a 1993 book about virtual communities by Howard Rheingold, a member of the early network system The WELL. A second edition, with a new concluding chapter, was published in 2000 by MIT Press.

The book's discussion ranges from Rheingold's adventures on The WELL, computer-mediated communication and social groups and information science. Technologies cited include Usenet, MUDs (multi-user dungeons) and their derivatives MUSHes and MOOs, Internet Relay Chat (IRC), chat rooms, and electronic mailing lists. Rheingold also points out the potential benefits for personal psychological well-being, as well as for society at large, of belonging to a virtual community.
