= Out of the Inner Circle =

1985 book by Howard Rheingold

Out of the Inner Circle: A Hacker's Guide to Computer Security
- Author: Bill Landreth, Howard Rheingold
- Publisher: Microsoft Press, Simon & Schuster
- Publication date: 1985
- ISBN: 0-671-30942-0

Out of the Inner Circle: A Hacker's Guide to Computer Security is a book by Bill Landreth and Howard Rheingold, published in 1985 by Microsoft Press and distributed by Simon & Schuster (ISBN 0-671-30942-0). The book was created to provide insight into the ways and methods of the hacking community in the days before Internet became prevalent. Although largely outdated and nostalgic, it does show what brought on many of the current trends we see in network security today.
