= Howard Rheingold =

American critic, writer, and teacher (born 1947)

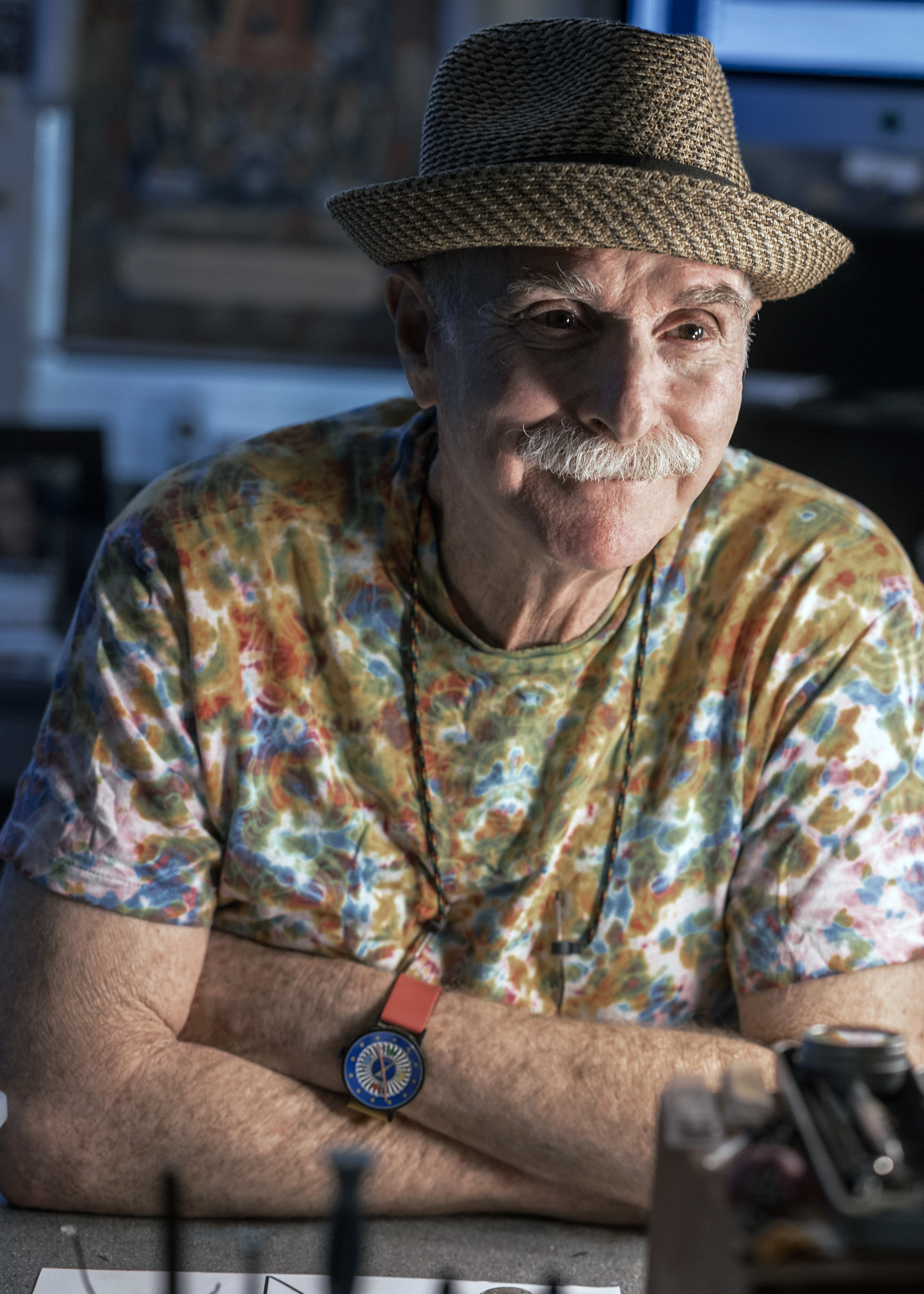
- Rheingold in 2016
- Born: July 7, 1947 (age 79); Phoenix, Arizona, US
- Education: Reed College
- Occupations: Critic; writer; teacher
- Spouse: Judy
- Website: rheingold.com

Howard Rheingold (born 1947) is an American critic, writer, and teacher, known for his specialties on the cultural, social and political implications of modern communication media such as the Internet, mobile telephony and virtual communities.

== Biography ==
Rheingold was born on July 7, 1947, in Phoenix, Arizona. He graduated from Reed College in Portland, Oregon, in 1968. His senior thesis was entitled What Life Can Compare with This? Sitting Alone at the Window, I Watch the Flowers Bloom, the Leaves Fall, the Seasons Come and Go.

A lifelong fascination with mind augmentation and its methods led Rheingold to the Institute of Noetic Sciences and Xerox PARC. There he worked on and wrote about the earliest personal computers. This led to his writing Tools for Thought in 1985, a history of the people behind the personal computer. Around that time he first logged on to The WELL – an influential early online community. He explored the experience in his seminal book, The Virtual Community.

Also in 1985, Rheingold coauthored Out of the Inner Circle: A Hacker's Guide to Computer Security with former hacker Bill Landreth. In 1991, he published Virtual Reality: Exploring the Brave New Technologies of Artificial Experience and Interactive Worlds from Cyberspace to Teledildonics.

After a stint editing the Whole Earth Review, Rheingold served as editor in chief of the Millennium Whole Earth Catalog. Shortly thereafter, he was hired on as founding executive editor of HotWired, one of the first commercial content web sites published in 1994 by Wired magazine. Rheingold left HotWired and soon founded Electric Minds in 1996 to chronicle and promote the growth of community online. Despite accolades, the site was sold and scaled back in 1997.

In 1998, he created his next virtual community, Brainstorms, which, as of 2024, is a successful private webconferencing community for knowledgeable, intellectual, civil, and future-thinking adults from all over the world.

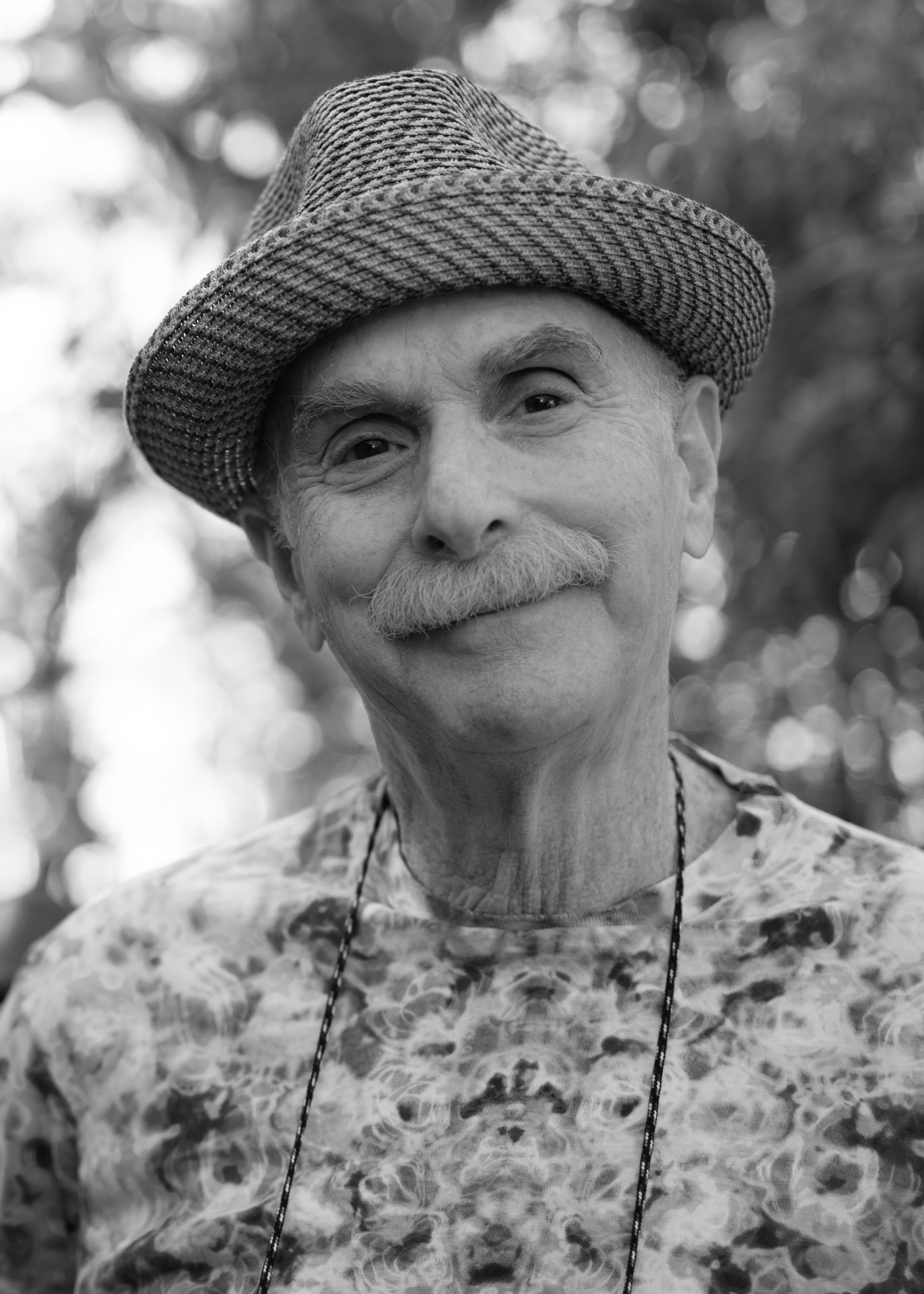
Rheingold in Mill Valley

In 2002, Rheingold published Smart Mobs, exploring the potential for technology to augment collective intelligence. Shortly thereafter, in conjunction with the Institute for the Future, Rheingold launched an effort to develop a broad-based literacy of cooperation.

In 2008, Rheingold became the first research fellow at the Institute for the Future, with which he had long been affiliated.

Rheingold is a visiting lecturer in Stanford University's Department of Communication where he has taught courses such as "Digital Journalism", "Virtual Communities and Social Media", and "Social Media Literacies". He is a former lecturer in UC Berkeley's School of Information where he taught "Virtual Communities and Social Media" and "Participatory Media/Collective Action". He has been a frequent contributor to the Connected Learning Alliance blog on topics ranging from new media literacy to learning innovation.

Rheingold lives in Mill Valley, California, with his wife Judy and daughter Mamie. In an entry on his video blog, he provides a tour of the converted garage that became a "dream office" and an "externalization of [his] mind" where Rheingold absorbs information, writes, and creates art.

He contributed the essay "Participative Pedagogy for a Literacy of Literacies" to the Freesouls book project.

== Selected bibliography ==
- Talking Tech: A conversational Guide to Science and Technology, with Howard Levine (1982) ISBN 978-0-688-00783-6
- Higher Creativity: Liberating the Unconscious for Breakthrough Insight, with Willis Harman (1984) ISBN 978-0-874-77335-4
- Tools for Thought: The History and Future of Mind-Expanding Technology (free in HTML form) (1985) ISBN 978-0-262-68115-5
- Out of the Inner Circle, with Bill Landreth (1985) ISBN 978-0-914-84545-4
- They Have a Word for It: A Lighthearted Lexicon of Untranslatable Words & Phrases (1988) ISBN 978-0-965-08079-8
- The Cognitive Connection: Thought and Language in Man and Machine, with Howard Levine (1987) ISBN 978-0-131-39619-7
- Excursions to the Far Side of the Mind (1988) ISBN 978-0-688-06833-2
- Exploring the World of Lucid Dreaming, with Stephen LaBerge (1990) ISBN 978-0-345-37410-3
- Virtual Reality (1991) ISBN 978-0-671-77897-2
- The Virtual Community: Homesteading on the Electronic Frontier, (free in HTML form) (1993) ISBN 0-201-60870-7
- Millennium Whole Earth Catalog: Access to Tools and Ideas for the Twenty-First Century (1995) ISBN 978-006-251141-6
- The Virtual Community: Homesteading on the Electronic Frontier (2000 reprint with some new material) ISBN 0-262-68121-8
- Smart Mobs: The Next Social Revolution (2002) ISBN 0-7382-0608-3
- Net Smart: How to Thrive Online (2012) ISBN 0-262-01745-8
- Mind Amplifier: Can Our Digital Tools Make Us Smarter? (free in PDF form) (2012) ISBN 978-100-558796-3

== See also ==
- Information society
- Peter Kollock
