= Subvocal recognition =

Converting subvocalization to a digital output

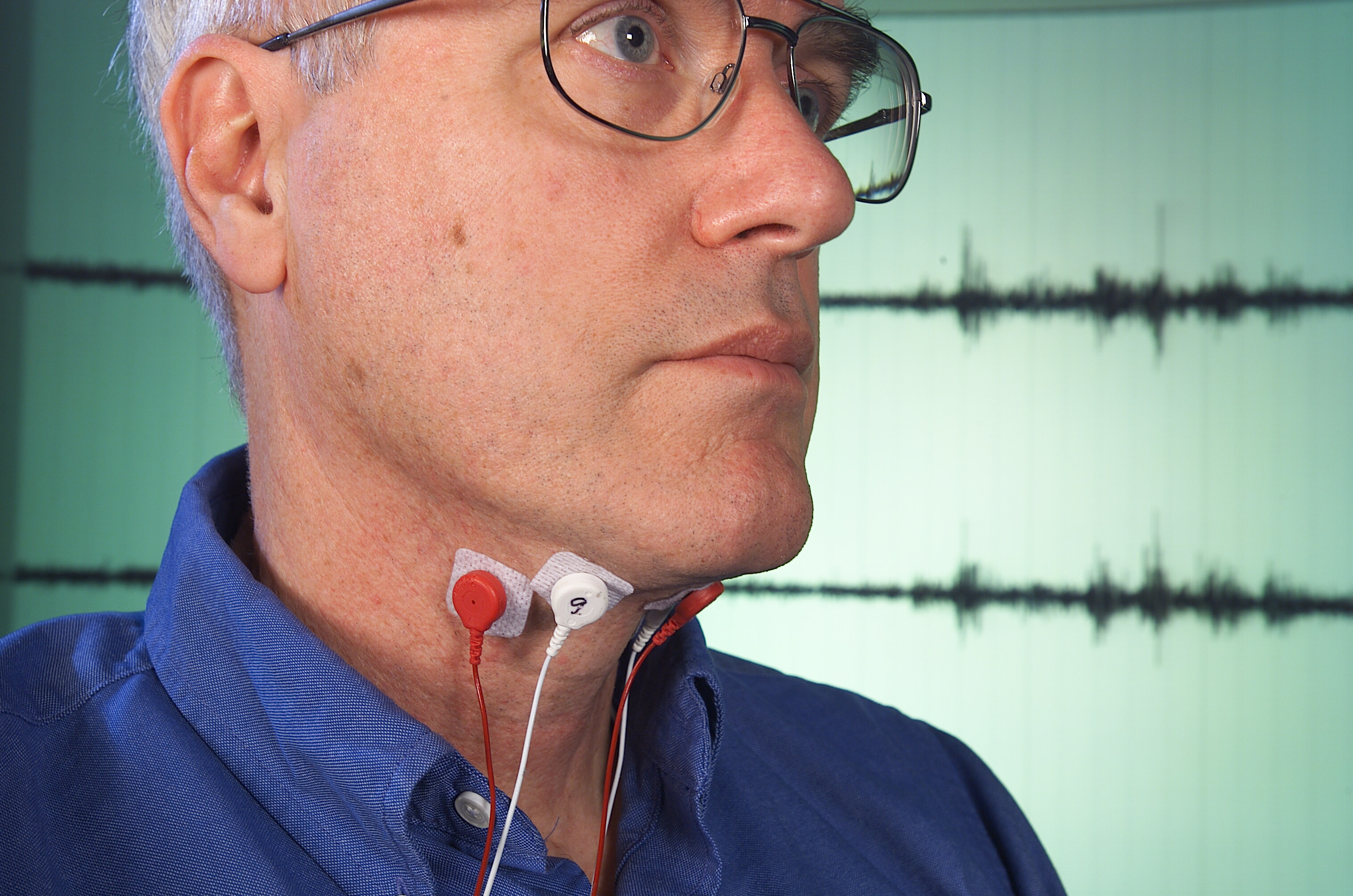
Electrodes used in subvocal speech recognition research at NASA's Ames Research Lab

Subvocal recognition (SVR) is the process of taking subvocalization and converting the detected results to a digital output, aural or text-based. A silent speech interface is a device that allows speech communication without using the sound made when people vocalize their speech sounds. It works by the computer identifying the phonemes that an individual pronounces from nonauditory sources of information about their speech movements. These are then used to recreate the speech using speech synthesis.

== Input methods ==
Silent speech interface systems have been created using ultrasound and optical camera input of tongue and lip movements. Electromagnetic devices are another technique for tracking tongue and lip movements.

The detection of speech movements by electromyography of speech articulator muscles and the larynx is another technique. Another source of information is the vocal tract resonance signals that get transmitted through bone conduction called non-audible murmurs.

They have also been created as a brain–computer interface using brain activity in the motor cortex obtained from intracortical microelectrodes.

== Uses ==
Such devices are created as aids to those unable to create the sound phonation needed for audible speech such as after laryngectomies. Another use is for communication when speech is masked by background noise or distorted by self-contained breathing apparatus. A further practical use is where a need exists for silent communication, such as when privacy is required in a public place, or hands-free data silent transmission is needed during a military or security operation.

In 2002, the Japanese company NTT DoCoMo announced it had created a silent mobile phone using electromyography and imaging of lip movement. The company stated that "the spur to developing such a phone was ridding public places of noise," adding that, "the technology is also expected to help people who have permanently lost their voice." The feasibility of using silent speech interfaces for practical communication has since then been shown.

In 2019, Arnav Kapur, a researcher from the Massachusetts Institute of Technology, conducted a study known as AlterEgo. Its implementation of the silent speech interface enables direct communication between the human brain and external devices through stimulation of the speech muscles. By leveraging neural signals associated with speech and language, the AlterEgo system deciphers the user's intended words and translates them into text or commands without the need for audible speech.

In 2026, Aarush Yadav and Arnav Kumar, through their startup The Subvocal Company, announced smart glasses that use radar sensing to track movements of the internal speech articulators to decode subtly articulated silent speech.

== Research ==
With a grant from the U.S. Army, research into synthetic telepathy using subvocalization is taking place at the University of California, Irvine under lead scientist Mike D'Zmura.

NASA's Ames Research Laboratory is conducting subvocalization research under the supervision of Charles Jorgensen.

The Brain Computer Interface R&D program at Wadsworth Center under the New York State Department of Health has confirmed the existing ability to decipher consonants and vowels from imagined speech, which allows for brain-based communication using imagined speech, however using EEGs instead of subvocalization techniques.

== In fiction ==
- The decoding of silent speech using a computer played an important role in Arthur C. Clarke's story and Stanley Kubrick's associated film A Space Odyssey. In this, HAL 9000, a computer controlling spaceship Discovery One, bound for Jupiter, discovers a plot to deactivate it by the mission astronauts Dave Bowman and Frank Poole through lip reading their conversations.
- In Orson Scott Card's series (including Ender's Game), the artificial intelligence can be spoken to while the protagonist wears a movement sensor in his jaw, enabling him to converse with the AI without making noise. He also wears an ear implant.
- In Speaker for the Dead and subsequent novels, author Orson Scott Card described an ear implant, called a "jewel", that allows subvocal communication with computer systems.
- Author Robert J. Sawyer made use of subvocal recognition to allow silent commands to the cybernetic 'companion implants' used by the advanced Neanderthal characters in his Neanderthal Parallax trilogy of science fiction novels.
- In Earth, David Brin depicts this technology and its uses as a normal gear in the near future.
- In Down and Out in the Magic Kingdom, Cory Doctorow has cellphone technology become silent through a cochlear implant and miking the throat to pick up subvocalization.
- William Gibson's Sprawl Trilogy frequently uses sub-vocalization systems in various devices.
- In Kage Baker's Company novels, the immortal cyborgs communicate subvocally.
- In the Hugo Award-winning Hyperion Cantos by Dan Simmons, the characters often use subvocalization to communicate.
- In the Culture novels by Iain M. Banks, more highly advanced species often communicate subvocally through their technology.
- In Deus Ex: Human Revolution (2011), the protagonist is augmented with a subvocalization implant for sending covert communications (and a corresponding cochlear implant for receiving covert communications).
- In the tabletop RPG and video game series Shadowrun, player characters can communicate via subvocal microphones in some instances.
- In Paranoia, all citizens can speak to the computer via their "cerebral cortech" implants.
- Alistair Reynolds Revelation Space trilogy frequently uses sub-vocalization systems in various devices.

== See also ==
- Automated Lip Reading
- Applications of artificial intelligence
- Electrolarynx
- List of emerging technologies
- Outline of artificial intelligence
- Speech recognition
- Silent speech interface
- Throat microphone
- Synthetic telepathy
