= Vision span =

Arc of accurate visual perception

Peripheral vision of the human eye.

Vision span or perceptual span is a controversial concept referring to the angular span (vertically and horizontally), within which the human eye has sharp enough vision to perform an action accurately (reading or face recognition). The visual field of the human eye spans approximately 120 degrees of arc. However, most of that arc is peripheral vision. The human eye has much greater resolution in the macula, where there is a higher density of cone cells. The macula has a diameter of about 16 degrees of the retina. The field of view that is observed with sufficient resolution to read text typically spans about 6 degrees of arc, which is wide enough to allow a clear view of about five words in a row when printed text at ordinary size is held about 50 centimeters from the eyes. Regarding face processing, the field of view with a sufficient amount of information in order to recognise faces accurately spans about 7° which represents about 45% of a face. The brain creates the illusion of having a greater visual span by automatically and unconsciously moving the center of vision into any area of interest in the field of view.

== Application to speed reading ==
While reading, readers will fail to recognize a word unless they are fixating within three to four character spaces of the word. The same is true for speed readers and skimmers. Speed readers cannot answer questions about a main point or detail, if they did not fixate directly on it or within three character spaces of it. When a text is removed whilst reading, readers can only accurately report upon the word they were fixating upon or the next one to the right. There is no evidence from eye movement research that individuals are making predictions of text based upon hypotheses about the words in the periphery so that they can skip over or spend less time on unimportant or redundant words.

Most speed reading courses claim that the peripheral vision can be used to read text. This has been suggested impossible because the text is blurred out through lack of visual resolution. At best the human brain can only guess at the content of text outside the macular region. There simply are not enough cone cells away from the center of the visual field to identify words in the periphery of the field.

It has been suggested that the fixation span can be stretched through training (meta guiding) to take in as much as a line for the purpose of skimming or speed reading. However other sources suggest that using this method can result in a severely reduced comprehension rate in comparison to normal reading ("rauding").

Some speed reading courses stress that the human eye has to move very quickly. They also stress that the human eye should move in a pattern to fill in the information that was not properly perceived. The effective limit for scanning speeds based upon the limit of the human eye's resolution is about 300 words per minute. It is claimed that such speeds also require great practice, and extremely rapid eye movements, although research suggests that such training is not possible. It has been suggested by some speed reading promoters that the readers who achieve such speeds are on the autism spectrum. Research into reading rate suggests that study strategies, rather than speed reading, explains why expert readers, such as professors and editors, are more efficient than others.

== Application to face processing ==
Face recognition system requires several fixation on different location (typically in a triangular pattern) for a face to be recognised. The same is true for the so-called Super Recognisers who are persons with high face recognition capabilities. Similarly to the reading span, the Facespan might be modulated by difficulty, expertise, age, disorder and other idiosyncratic differences between individuals. The idiosyncratic differences are thus most probably due to differences in Facespan rather than in oculomotor strategy. Previous study revealed that the Vision span is more accurately defined in number of characters rather than in visual angle.

== See also ==
- PhotoReading
