= Learning power =

Concept in cognitive science

Learning power refers to the collection of psychological traits and skills that enable a person to engage effectively with a variety of learning challenges. The concept emerged during the 1980s and 90s, for example in the writings of the cognitive scientist Guy Claxton, as a way of describing the form of intelligence possessed by someone who, to quote Jean Piaget's phrase,"…knows what to do when they don't know what to do." The forms of learning envisaged are typically broader than those encountered in formal educational settings, for example those that are of most use in learning sports or musical instruments, or in mastering complex social situations.

== Composition: The Elements of Learning Power. ==
Though Learning Power is conceived as a form of intelligence, it differs from some more familiar notions of intelligence in a number of important ways.

- First, it is seen as eminently practical, and not revealed particularly through solving abstract problems against the clock.
- Second, it is not primarily intellectual, but involves characteristics more usually associated with personality, such as emotional resilience in the face of difficulty or frustration.
- Third, Learning Power is conceived of as a composite of interwoven capacities, rather than as a distinct 'monolithic' mental entity.
- Fourth, the elements of Learning power are usually described as dispositions (David Perkins), Habits of mind(Art Costa) or 'capacities' (Guy Claxton) rather than skills. Skills are abilities that may need prompting - they do not necessarily come to mind when they are needed - whereas Learning power refers to a persistent orientation towards learning. Those with high levels of Learning Power can be said to be generally open to learning opportunities, and typically find engaging with challenges where they are uncertain of success pleasurable rather than aversive.
- Finally, all the elements of learning power are seen as capable of development. Whereas conventional measures of IQ are taken to reflect intellectual endowments that are relatively constant over time and context, Learning Power emphasises the role of experience in expanding, or sometimes contracting, the dispositions towards learning. This emphasis reflects the concern of those who use the concept with education: specifically with education seen as a preparation for lifelong learning.

Different authors have produced lists of the ingredients of Learning Power that differ somewhat, but largely overlap. Those of US authors such as Costa, Perkins and Ritchhart tend to be more focused on the kinds of intellectual learning typical of high schools and universities, while that of Claxton and his associates in the UK (Ruth Deakin-Crick, Bill Lucas) attempt to cover learning in informal as well as formal settings.

=== Building Learning Power ===
Within his Building Learning Power framework, for example, Guy Claxton proposes a list of 17 learning capacities grouped into four clusters called resilience, resourcefulness, reciprocity and reflection.

- Resilience covers the emotional and attentional aspects of learning, and includes perseverance, absorption (or flow), concentration (or managing distraction) and perceptiveness (or attentive noticing).
- Resourcefulness focuses on the cognitive aspects of learning, including questioning, connecting (making links), imagining, reasoning, and capitalising (making smart use of resources).
- Reciprocity covers the social dimension of learning, and includes interdependence (balancing social and solitary learning), collaboration, listening and empathy, and imitation (receptivity to others' learning strengths).
- Reflection covers the aspects of learning that are to do with strategic management and self-awareness. They include planning, self-evaluating (revising), looking for further application (distilling) and fluency in the languages of learning (meta learning).

More recently the framework has been developed in collaboration with Bill Lucas to more explicitly cover non-academic or 'real-world' learning. Practical tools for schools have been developed that are aimed at enhancing students' confidence and capacity as learners, both within the institution and beyond. The tools embrace Art Costa's [Habits of Mind] programme, Ruth Deakin-Crick's ELLI (Effective Lifelong Learning Inventory) self-report questionnaire for assessing the development of learning power and Guy Claxton's Building Learning Power (BLP) publications and materials. Some of these concentrate on practical routines and methods for use by classroom teachers, while others attempt to take a broader approach towards whole-school culture change.

=== Criticisms ===
Most of the educational approaches based on the idea of Learning power are still in development, so large scale evaluations are thin on the ground as Ritchhart records in his work on dispositional development. The ELLI instrument is well trialled and several reports of its development and use have been published. Guy Claxton's Building Learning Power programme has produced several hundred action research reports.

== See also ==
- Lifelong learning
