= Smart Mobs =

2002 book by Howard Rheingold

Smart Mobs: The Next Social Revolution
- Softcover edition
- Author: Howard Rheingold
- Language: English
- Subject: Sociology, technology
- Genre: Non-fiction
- Publisher: Basic Books
- Publication date: 15 October 2002
- Publication place: United States
- Media type: Print, e-book
- Pages: 288 pp.
- ISBN: 0-7382-0608-3
- OCLC: 50819606
- LC Class: HM846 .R54 2002

Smart Mobs: The Next Social Revolution is a book by Howard Rheingold dealing with the social, economic and political changes implicated by developing technology. The book covers subjects from text-messaging culture to Wireless Internet developments to the impact of the web on the marketplace. The author highlights the many ways in which technology alters and impacts the way in which people live and think.

== See also ==
- Collective intelligence
