= Speed reading =

Techniques claiming to improve the ability to read quickly

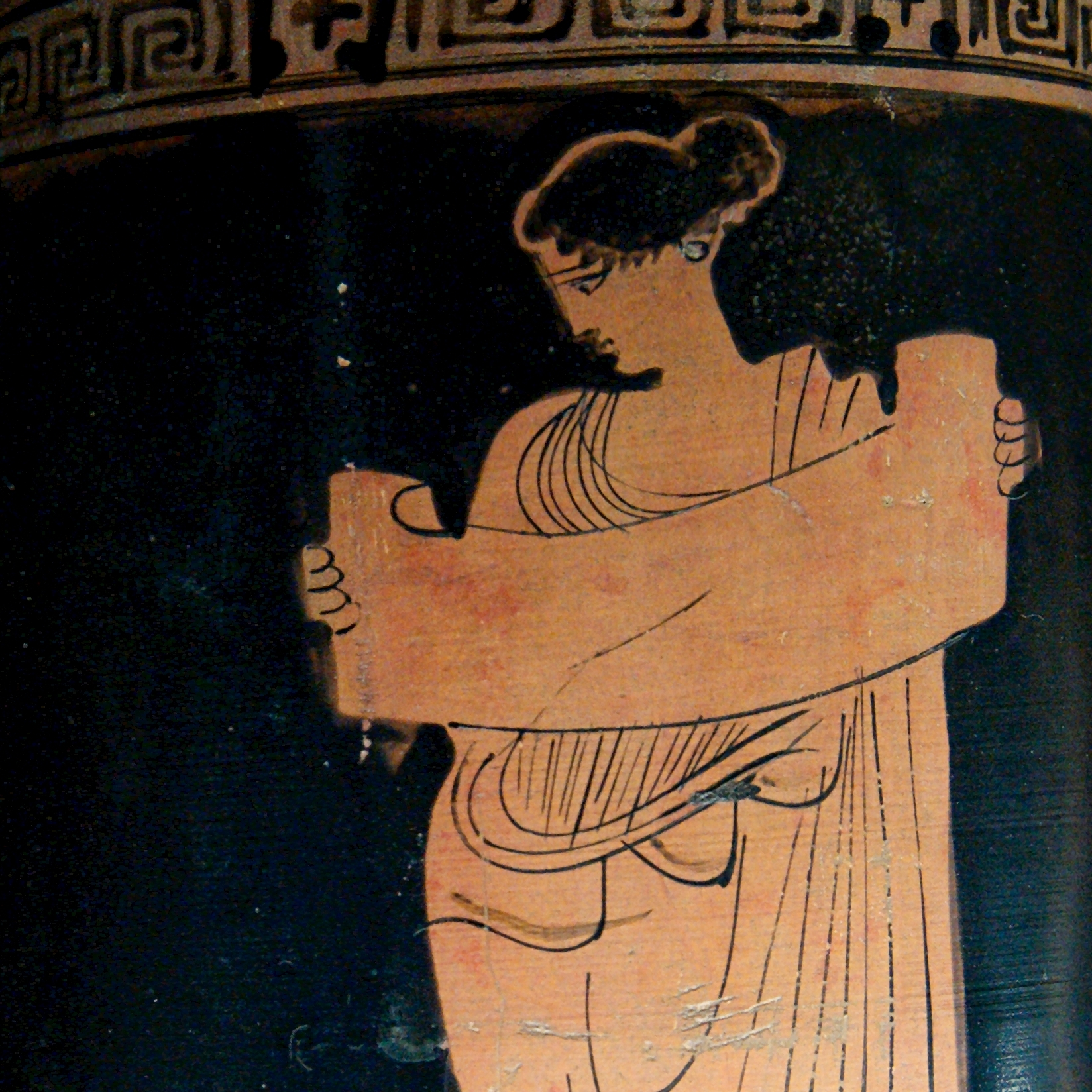
A reading muse

Speed reading is any of many techniques claiming to improve one's ability to read quickly. Speed-reading methods include chunking and minimizing subvocalization. The many available speed-reading training programs may utilize books, videos, software, and seminars.

There is little scientific evidence regarding speed reading, and as a result its value seems uncertain. Cognitive neuroscientist Stanislas Dehaene says that claims of reading up to 1,000 words per minute "must be viewed with skepticism".

== History ==
The term "speed reading" is thought to have been coined in the late 1950s by Evelyn Wood, a schoolteacher. She was reportedly curious why some people were naturally faster at reading, so tried to force herself to read very quickly. In 1958, while brushing off the pages of a book she had thrown, she noticed that the sweeping motion of her hand across the page caught the attention of her eyes, and helped them move more smoothly across the page. She then used the hand as a pacer. Wood first taught the method at the University of Utah, before launching it to the public as Evelyn Wood's Reading Dynamics in Washington, D.C. in 1959.

== Methods and principles ==
=== Skimming and scanning ===
Skimming is a process of speed reading that involves visually searching the sentences of a page for clues to the main idea or when reading an essay, it can mean reading the beginning and ending for summary information, then optionally the first sentence of each paragraph to quickly determine whether to seek still more detail, as determined by the questions or purpose of the reading. For some people, this comes naturally, but is usually acquired by practice. Skimming is usually seen more in adults than in children. It is conducted at a higher rate (700 words per minute and above) than normal reading for comprehension (around 200–230 wpm), and results in lower comprehension rates, especially with information-rich reading material.

Scanning is a process building on skimming, where the reader actively looks for information in the text, possibly while taking notes or creating a mind-map (organizing information in a visually hierarchical manner that showcases the interrelatedness of the information for better retrievability). These techniques are used by meta-guiding the eyes). Scanning techniques generally advise to capture the main point and identify structures and ideas through headings and other visual highlighting provided by the author.

=== Finger tracing ===
With finger tracing or meta-guiding, readers point to specific lines or areas (with their fingers), to help focus on the sentences being read (or paragraphs being skimmed), reduce cognitive load, and increase retention.

== Types of reading ==
Speed reading advocates claim there are three types of reading:

1. Subvocalization: sounding out each word internally, as reading to oneself. This is the slowest form of reading.
2. Auditory reading: hearing out the read words. This is a faster process.
3. Visual reading: understanding the meaning of the word, rather than sounding or hearing. This is the fastest process.

Subvocalization readers (Mental readers) generally read at approximately 250 words per minute, auditory readers at approximately 450 words per minute and visual readers at approximately 700 words per minute. Proficient readers are able to read 280–350 wpm without compromising comprehension.

== Effect on comprehension ==
Skimming is mainly used for researching and getting an overall idea of a text, especially when time is limited. Duggan & Payne (2009) compared skimming with reading normally, given only enough time to read normally through half of a text. They found that the main points of the full text were better understood after skimming (which could view the full text) than after normal reading (which only read half the text). There was no difference between the groups in their understanding of less important information from the text. Skimming or skipping over text can also aid in comprehension when layered reading, a process of strategic rereading, is employed. Further findings suggest that trained speed readers have a slight advantage in both comprehension and speed to untrained skimmers. It is thus suggested by experts that speed-reading is most useful to those who need "to skim a large amount of material or need to improve their study skills" and less useful to those who read "highly technical material that requires careful study of each sentence".

Research suggests that there are neurological and psychological limits to how quickly the brain can process written language while maintaining comprehension. Eye-tracking and neuro-imaging studies show that comprehension declines sharply when the reading speed exceeds 400–500 words per minute, particularly when reading unfamiliar or complex material. Some researchers argue that most speed reading techniques are closer to skimming and may involve a trade-off between speed and depth of understanding.

== Software ==
Eye exercise for speed reading

Computer programs are available to help instruct speed reading students. Some programs present the data as a serial stream, since the brain handles text more efficiently by breaking it into such a stream before parsing and interpreting it. The 2000 National Reading Panel (NRP) report (p. 3-1) seems to support such a mechanism.

To increase speed, some older programs required readers to view the center of the screen while the lines of text around it grew longer. They also presented several objects (instead of text) that move line by line or bounce around the screen. Users had to follow the object(s) with only their eyes. A number of researchers criticize using objects instead of words as an effective training method, claiming that the only way to read faster is to read actual text. Many of the newer speed reading programs use built-in text, and they primarily guide users through the lines of an on-screen book at defined speeds. Often, the text is highlighted to indicate where users should focus their eyes. They are not expected to read by pronouncing the words but instead to read by viewing the words as complete images. The exercises are also intended to train readers to eliminate subvocalization.

== Controversies in speed reading ==
Common controversies in speed reading are between its intent and nature with traditional concepts like comprehension versus speed, reading versus skimming, and popular psychology versus evidence-based psychology. Much of the controversy is raised over these points. This is mainly because a reading comprehension level of 50% is deemed unusable by some educationalists. Advocates claim that speed reading is a great success and that it is a demonstration of good comprehension for many purposes. The trade-off between speed and comprehension must be analyzed with respect to the type of reading that is being done, the risks associated with misunderstanding due to low comprehension, and the benefits associated with getting through the material quickly and gaining information at the actual rate is to be obtained. Mark Seidenberg considers claims like reading 25,000 words per minute "cannot be true given basic facts about eyes and texts". He goes on to say that "people are as likely to read thousands of words per minute as they are to run faster than the speed of light".

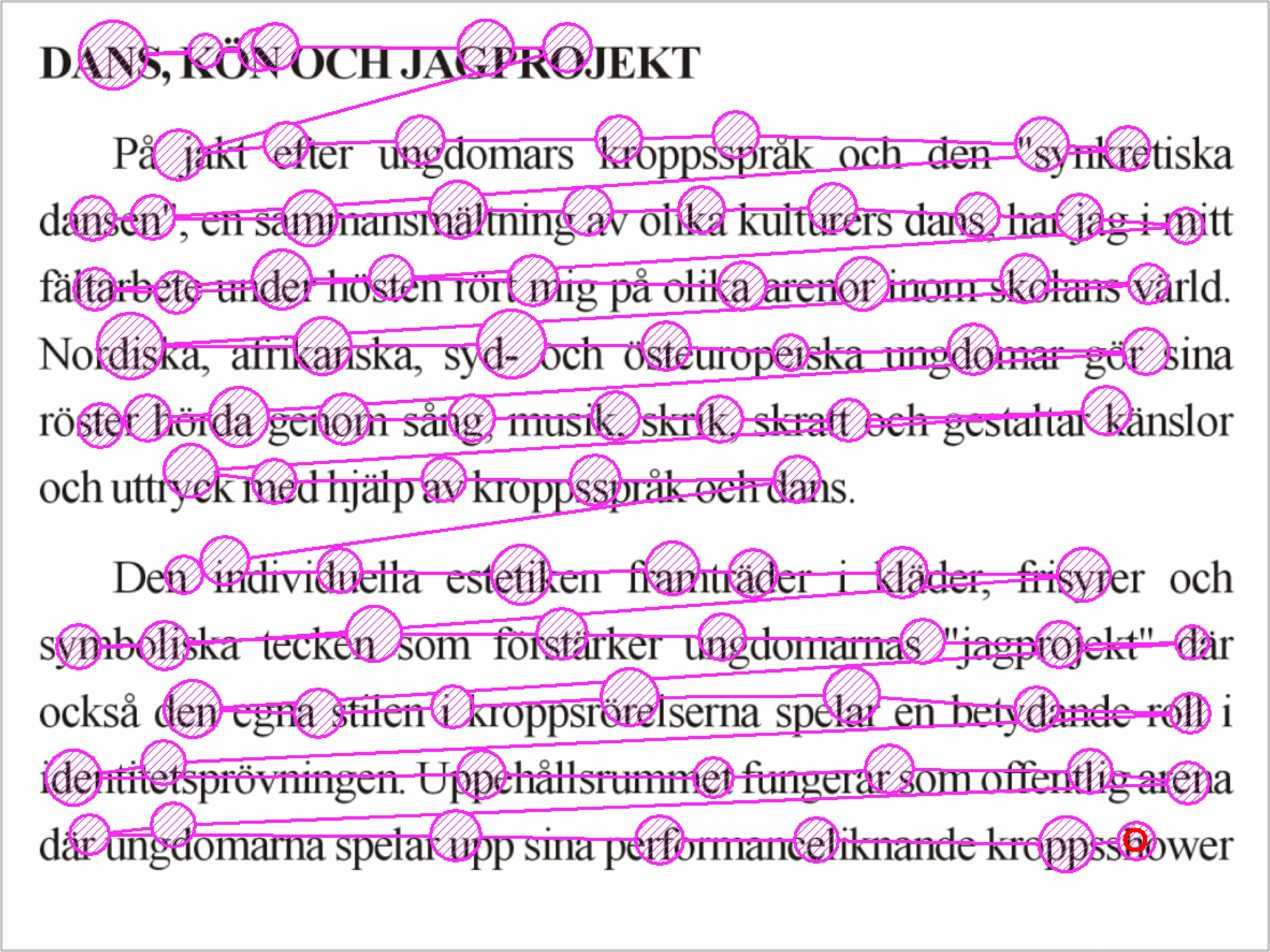
A plot of the eye movements of a speed reader

Similarly, in evaluating a claim that a similar reading strategy known as PhotoReading could increase reading rates to 25,000 words per minute, McNamara published a preliminary analysis funded by NASA to evaluate whether this strategy could improve reading speed, comprehension, and information gathering efficiency. When identical versions of five reading samples and accompanying reading comprehension tests were administered to a trainee and an expert in this reading strategy, there was no advantage in overall reading time or comprehension. This strategy may also cause overestimation of one's knowledge, as demonstrated by the following case in McNamara's preliminary analysis, showing evidence of the Dunning-Kruger effect:

The final task given to the PhotoReading expert was to read the three chapters from the textbook on Physiology in order to take an exam from a course that used that textbook. The question was simply: Would she pass the exam? The expert took 73 minutes to PhotoRead and read the three chapters of the textbook required for the test (i.e., 361 words per minute). She PhotoRead for 9 minutes the night before taking the test. The following morning, she read the text using various rapid reading and activation techniques. She then answered the questions. She completed the 6 true/false and 30 multiple choice questions, but did not attempt to answer the fill-in-the-blank or short-answer questions. Hence, comprehension performance on the conceptual questions was 0 percent. She answered 2 of 7 multiple-choice prior knowledge questions correctly (29%). Of the text relevant questions, she answered 4 of 6 true/false questions correctly (67%), and 8 of 23 multiple-choice question correctly (35%). This performance is extremely low and only slightly above chance level performance for these types of questions (i.e., 50% and 25%, respectively). In sum, she did not pass the exam.

It is important to note that after PhotoReading the text (but before taking the test), she rated her understanding of the material as 4.5 on a 5-point scale (5 representing a good understanding). Moreover, she estimated that she would remember approximately 68 percent of the material for the test, with a grade of C+. This high level of confidence in terms of her text comprehension would have remained unshattered had she not then taken the test – after which she rated her comprehension much lower (i.e., 2)

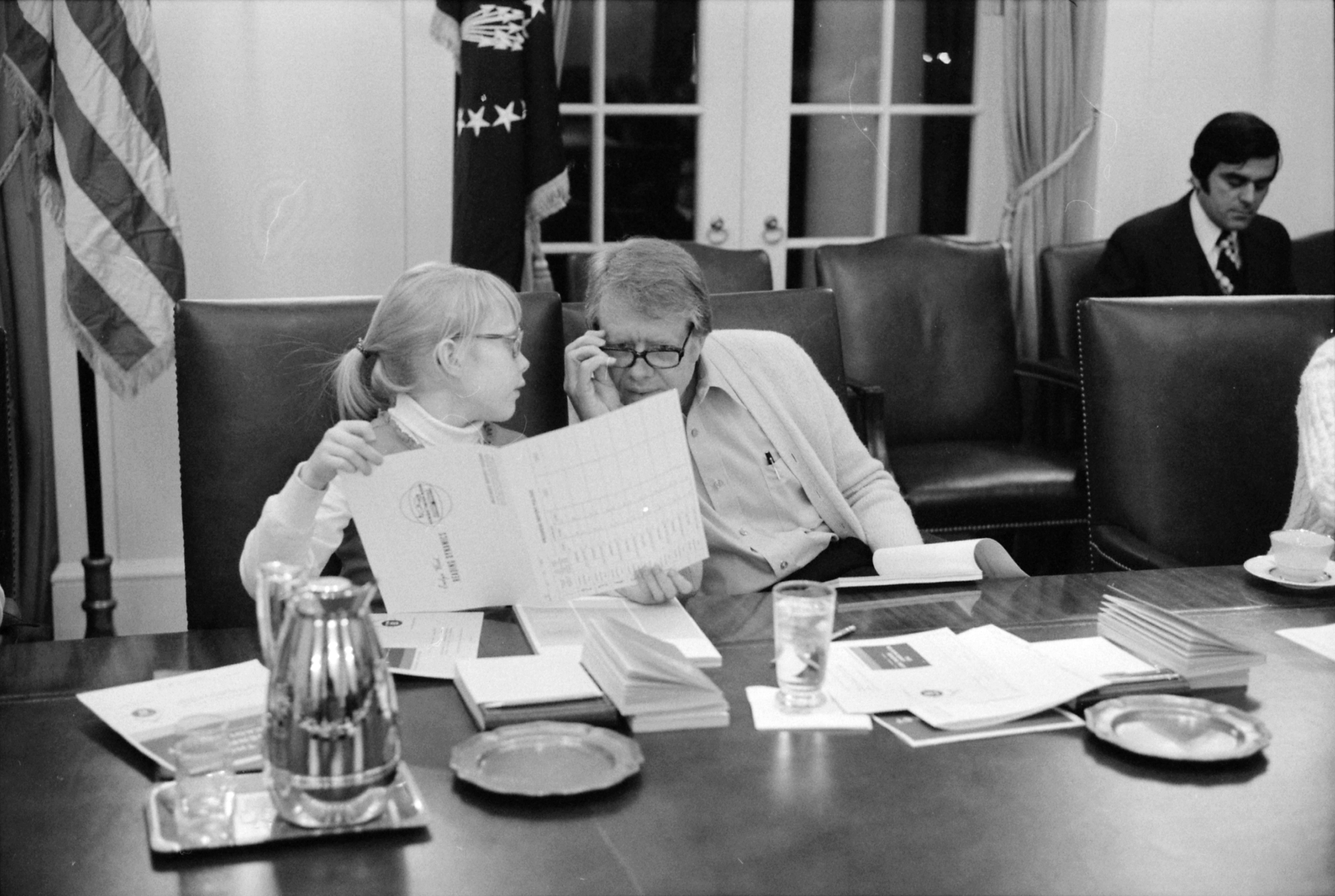
Jimmy Carter and his daughter Amy participate in a speed reading course.

In a 2016 article published in the journal of Psychological Science in the Public Interest, the authors conclude there is no "magic bullet" for reading more quickly while maintaining comprehension other than to practice reading and to become a more skilled language user (e.g. through increased vocabulary). The authors proceed with debunking common speed reading techniques such as eliminating sub-vocalization, reading more than one word at a time a.k.a. grouping, using RSVP (Rapid Serial Visual Presentation), increasing peripheral vision, alternating colors for each line of text. Marshall McLuhan was initially a convert to speed reading; however, he later concluded it was only useful for tasks like "scanning junk mail".

U.S. President John F. Kennedy was a proponent of speed reading, encouraging his staff to take lessons, and he suggested in an interview that he had a reading speed of 1,200 words per minute. U.S. President Jimmy Carter, and his wife Rosalynn, were both avid readers and enrolled in a speed-reading course at the White House, along with several staff members.

Ronald Carver, a professor of education research and psychology, claims that the fastest college graduate readers can read only about 600 words per minute, at most twice as fast as their slowest counterparts, and suggests that Kennedy's claimed reading speed was more a measure of how fast he could skim a piece of text. Other critics have suggested that speed reading is actually skimming, not reading.

The World Championship Speed Reading Competition stresses reading comprehension as critical. The top contestants typically read around 1,000 to 2,000 words per minute with approximately 50% comprehension or above. The six-time world champion Anne Jones is recorded for 4200 wpm with previous exposure to the material and 67% comprehension. The recorded number of words the eye can see in single fixation is three words.

"Speed Reading World Record" claims have been controversial. Howard Stephen Berg from the United States has claimed to be the Guinness World Record holder for fast reading with a speed of 25,000 words per minute, and Maria Teresa Calderon from the Philippines claims to have earned the Guinness World Record for World's Fastest Reader at 80,000 words per minute reading speed and 100% comprehension. Critics point out that it is possible to beat some speed reading world records by reading a pre-read or pre-memorized text, flipping the pages as fast as possible without reading it. The Guinness Speed Reading World Record Standards are not known and they have terminated adding speed readers to its honor list. In 2015, Memoriad, the World Mental Sports Federation, set the rules for "Speed Reading World Record Standards" in order to prevent unclear claims.

== See also ==
- Incremental reading – reading method aimed at long-term memorization
- Learning styles
- Learning to read
- Navon figure
- Pareto principle
- Slow reading − intentional reduction in the speed of reading
- TL;DR an abbreviation for "Too Long; Didn't Read"
