= Subvocalization =

Internal process while reading

Subvocalization, or silent speech, is the internal speech typically made when reading; it provides the sound of the word as it is read. This is a natural process when reading, and it helps the mind to access meanings to comprehend and remember what is read, potentially reducing cognitive load.

This inner speech is characterized by minuscule movements in the larynx and other muscles involved in the articulation of speech. Most of these movements are undetectable (without the aid of machines) by the person who is reading. It is one of the components of Alan Baddeley and Graham Hitch's phonological loop proposal which accounts for the storage of these types of information into short-term memory.

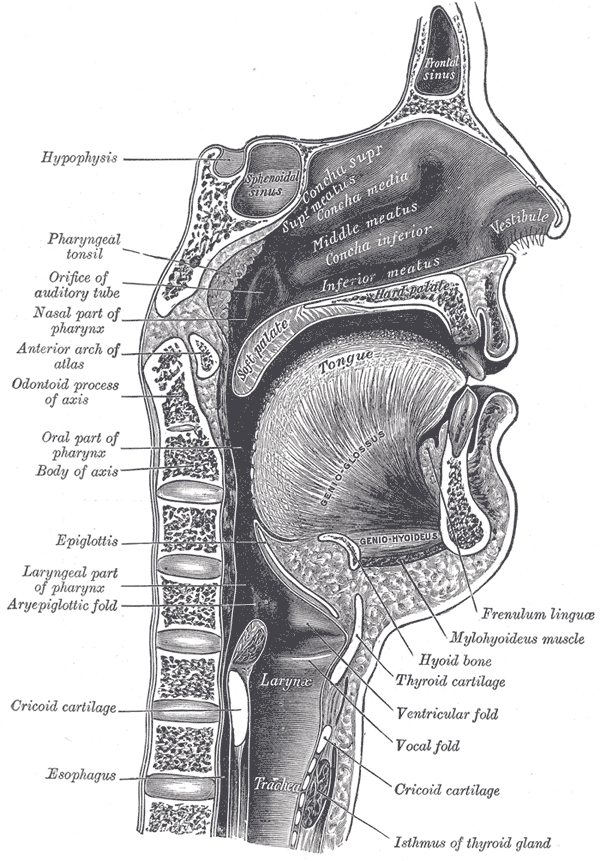
The larynx and associated musculature

== History of subvocalization research ==
Subvocalization has been considered as far back as 1868. Only in 1899 did an experiment take place to record movement of the larynx through silent reading by a researcher named H.S. Curtis, who concluded that silent reading was the only mental activity that created considerable movement of the larynx.

In 1950, Swedish psychologist Åke Werner Edfelt reached a breakthrough when he created an electrically powered instrument that can record movement. He concluded that newer techniques are needed to accurately record information and that efforts should be made to understand this phenomenon instead of eliminating it. After failed attempts trying to reduce silent speech in study participants, in 1952, it came to the conclusion that silent speech is a developmental activity which reinforces learning and should not be disrupted during development. In 1960, Edfelt seconded this opinion.

== Techniques for studying subvocalization ==
Subvocalization is commonly studied using electromyography (EMG) recordings, concurrent speaking tasks, shadowing, and other techniques.

EMG can be used to show the degree to which one is subvocalizing or to train subvocalization suppression. EMG is used to record the electrical activity produced by the articulatory muscles involved in subvocalization. Greater electrical activity suggests a stronger use of subvocalization. In the case of suppression training, the trainee is shown their own EMG recordings while attempting to decrease the movement of the articulatory muscles. The EMG recordings allows one to monitor and ideally reduce subvocalization.

In concurrent speaking tasks, participants of a study are asked to complete an activity specific to the experiment while simultaneously repeating an irrelevant word. For example, one may be asked to read a paragraph while reciting the word "cola" over and over again. Speaking the repeated irrelevant word is thought to preoccupy the articulators used in subvocalization. Subvocalization, therefore, cannot be used in the mental processing of the activity being studied. Participants who had undergone the concurrent speaking task are often compared to other participants of the study who had completed the same activity without subvocalization interference. If performance on the activity is significantly less for those in the concurrent speaking task group than for those in the non-interference group, subvocalization is believed to play a role in the mental processing of that activity. The participants in the non-interference comparison group usually also complete a different, yet equally distracting task that does not involve the articulator muscles (e.g. tapping). This ensures that the difference in performance between the two groups is in fact due to subvocalization disturbances and not due to considerations such as task difficulty or a divide in attention.

Shadowing is conceptually similar to concurrent speaking tasks. Instead of repeating an irrelevant word, shadowing requires participants to listen to a list of words and to repeat those words as fast as possible while completing a separate task being studied by experimenters.

Techniques for subvocalization interference may also include counting, chewing or locking one's jaw while placing the tongue on the roof of one's mouth.

Subvocal recognition involves monitoring actual movements of the tongue and vocal cords that can be interpreted by electromagnetic sensors. Through the use of electrodes and nanocircuitry, synthetic telepathy could be achieved allowing people to communicate silently.

== Evolutionary background ==
The exploration into the evolutionary background of subvocalization is currently very limited. The little known is predominantly about language acquisition and memory. Evolutionary psychologists suggest that the development of subvocalization is related to modular aspects of the brain. There has been a great amount of exploration on the evolutionary basis of universal grammar. The idea is that although the specific language one initially learns is dependent on one's culture, all languages are learned through the activation of universal "language modules" that are present in each of us. This concept of a modular mind is a prevalent idea that will help explore memory and its relation to language more clearly, and possibly illuminate the evolutionary basis of subvocalization. Evidence for the mind having modules for superior function is the example that hours may be spent toiling over a car engine in an attempt to flexibly formulate a solution, but, in contrast, extremely long and complex sentences can be comprehended, understood, related and responded to in seconds. The specific inquiry into subvocalization may be minimal right now but there remains much to investigate in regard to the modular mind.

== Associated brain structures and processes ==
The brain mechanics of subvocalization are still not well understood. It is safe to say that more than one part of the brain is used, and that no single test can reveal all the relevant processes. Studies often use event-related potentials; brief changes in an EEG (electroencephalography) to show brain activation, or fMRIs.

Subvocalization is related to inner speech; when inner speech is used, there is bilateral activation in predominantly the left frontal lobe. This activation could suggest that the frontal lobes may be involved in motor planning for speech output.

Subvocal rehearsal is controlled by top-down processing; conceptually driven, it relies on information already in memory. There is evidence for significant left hemisphere activation in the inferior and middle frontal gyri and inferior parietal gyrus during subvocal rehearsal. Broca's area has also been found to have activation in other studies exploring subvocal rehearsal.

Silent speech-reading and silent counting are also examined when experimenters look at subvocalization. These tasks show activation in the frontal cortices, hippocampus and the thalamus for silent counting. Silent-reading activates similar areas of the auditory cortex that are involved in listening.

Finally, the phonological loop; proposed by Baddeley and Hitch as "being responsible for temporary storage of speech-like information" is an active subvocal rehearsal mechanism, activation originating mostly in the left hemispheric speech areas: Broca's, lateral and medial premotor cortices and the cerebellum.

== Role of subvocalization in memory processes ==
=== The phonological loop and rehearsal ===
The ability to store verbal material in working memory, and the storage of verbal material in short-term memory relies on a phonological loop. This loop, proposed by Baddeley and Hitch, represents a system that is composed of a short-term store in which memory is represented phonologically, and a rehearsal process. This rehearsal preserves and refreshes the material by re-enacting it and re-presenting it to short-term storage, and subvocalization is a major component of this rehearsal. The phonological loop system features an interaction between subvocal rehearsal and specific storage for phonological material. The phonological loop contributes to the study of the role of subvocalization and the inner voice in auditory imagery. Subvocalization and the phonological loop interact in a non-dependent manner demonstrated by their differential requirements on different tasks. The role of subvocalization within the workings of memory processes is heavily reliant on its involvement with Baddeley's proposed phonological loop.

=== Working memory ===
There have been findings that support a role of subvocalization in the mechanisms underlying working memory and the holding of information in an accessible and malleable state. Some forms of internal speech-like processing may function as a holding mechanism in immediate memory tasks. The working memory span is a behavioural measure of "exceptional consistency" and is a positive function of the rate of subvocalization. Experimental data has shown that this span size increases as the rate of subvocalization increases, and the time needed to subvocalize the number of items comprising a span is generally constant. fMRI data suggests that a sequence of five letters approaches the individual capacity for immediate recall that relies on subvocal rehearsal alone.

=== Short-term memory ===
The role of subvocal rehearsal is also seen in short-term memory. Research has confirmed that this form of rehearsal benefits some cognitive functioning. Subvocal movements that occur when people listen to or rehearse a series of speech sounds will help the subject to maintain the phonemic representation of these sounds in their short-term memory, and this finding is supported by the fact that interfering with the overt production of speech sound did not disrupt the encoding of the sound's features in short-term memory. This suggests a strong role played by subvocalization in the encoding of speech sounds into short-term memory. It has also been found that language differences in short-term memory performance in bilingual people is mediated, but not exclusively, by subvocal rehearsal.

The production of acoustic errors in short-term memory is also thought to be, in part, due to subvocalization. Individuals who stutter and therefore have a slower rate of subvocal articulation also demonstrate a short-term reproduction of serial material that is slower as compared to people who do not stutter.

=== Encoding ===
Subvocalization plays a large role in memory encoding. Subvocalization appears to facilitate the translating of visual linguistic information into acoustic information and vice versa. For example, subvocalization occurs when one sees a word and is asked to say it (see-say condition), or when one hears a word and is asked to write it (hear-write condition), but not when one is asked to see a word and then write it (see-write condition) or hear a word and then say it (hear-say condition). The see-say condition converts visual information into acoustic information. The hear-write condition converts acoustic information into visual information. The see-write and hear-say conditions, however, remain in the same sensory domain and do not require translation into a different type of code.

This is also supported by findings that suggest that subvocalization is not required for the encoding of speech, as words being heard are already in acoustic form and therefore enter short-term memory directly without use of subvocal articulation. Furthermore, subvocalization interference impedes reading comprehension but not listening comprehension.

== Role in reading comprehension ==
Subvocalization's role in reading comprehension can be viewed as a function of task complexity. Subvocalization is involved minimally or not at all in immediate comprehension. For example, subvocalization is not used in the making of homophone judgements but is used more for the comprehension of sentences and even more still for the comprehension of paragraphs. Subvocalization which translates visual reading information into a more durable and flexible acoustic code is thought to allow for the integration of past concepts with those currently being processed.

== Comparison to speed reading ==
Advocates of speed reading generally claim that subvocalization places extra burden on the cognitive resources, thus slowing the reading down. Speedreading courses often prescribe lengthy practices to eliminate subvocalizing when reading. Normal reading instructors often simply apply remedial teaching to a reader who subvocalizes to the degree that they make visible movements on the lips, jaw, or throat.

Furthermore, fMRI studies comparing fast and slow readers (during a reading task) indicate that between the two groups there are significant differences in the brain areas being activated. In particular, it was found that rapid readers show lower activation in the brain regions associated with speech, which indicates that the higher speeds were attained, in part, by the reduction in subvocalization.

At the slower rates (memorizing, learning, and reading for comprehension), subvocalizing by the reader is very detectable. At the faster rates of reading (skimming and scanning), subvocalization is less detectable. For competent readers, subvocalizing to some extent even at scanning rates is normal.

Typically, subvocalizing is an inherent part of reading and understanding a word. Micro-muscle tests suggest that full and permanent elimination of subvocalizing is impossible. This may originate in the way people learn to read by associating the sight of words with their spoken sounds. Sound associations for words are indelibly imprinted on the nervous system—even of deaf people, since they will have associated the word with the mechanism for causing the sound or a sign in a particular sign language.

At the slower reading rates (100–300 words per minute), subvocalizing may improve comprehension. Subvocalizing or actual vocalizing can indeed be of great help when one wants to learn a passage verbatim. This is because the person is repeating the information in an auditory way, as well as seeing the piece on the paper.

== Auditory imagery ==
The definition of auditory imagery is analogous to definitions used in other modalities of imagery (such as visual and olfactory imagery) in that it is, according to Intons-Peterson (1992), "the introspective persistence of an auditory experience, including one constructed from components drawn from long-term memory, in the absence of direct sensory instigation of that experience.". Auditory imagery is often but not necessarily influenced by subvocalization, and has ties to the rehearsal process of working memory. The conception of working memory relies on a relationship between the "inner ear" and the "inner voice" (subvocalization), and this memory system is posited to be at the basis of auditory imagery. Subvocalization and the phonological store work in partnership in many auditory imagery tasks.

The extent to which an auditory image can influence detection, encoding and recall of a stimulus through its relationships to perception and memory has been documented. It has been suggested that auditory imagery may slow the decay of memory for pitch, as demonstrated by T. A. Keller, Cowan, and Saults (1995) who demonstrated that the prevention of rehearsal resulted in decreased memory performance for pitch comparison tasks through the introduction of distracting and competing stimuli. It has also been reported that auditory imagery for verbal material is impaired when subvocalization is blocked. These findings suggest that subvocalization is common to both auditory imagery and rehearsal.

In objection to a subvocalization mechanism basis for auditory imagery is in the fact that a significant amount of auditory imagery does not involve speech or stimuli similar to speech, such as music and environmental sounds. However, to combat this point, it has been suggested that rehearsal of non-speech sounds can indeed be carried out by the phonological mechanisms previously mentioned, even if the creation of nonspeech sounds within this mechanism is not possible.

== Role in speech ==
There are two general types of individuals when it comes to subvocalization. There are Low-Vocalizers and High-Vocalizers. Using electromyography to record the muscle action potential of the larynx (i.e. muscle movement of the larynx), an individual is categorized under a high or low vocalizer depending on how much muscle movement the muscles in the larynx undergo during silent reading.

=== Regulation of speech intensity ===
Often in both high and low vocalizers, the rate of speech is constantly regulated depending on intensity/volume of words (said to be affected by long delays between readings) and increasing the delay of speech and hearing ones' voice is an effect called “delayed auditory feedback”. Increasing the voice intensity while reading was found to be higher in low-vocalizers than high-vocalizers. It is believed that because high-vocalizers have greater muscle movement of the larynx during silent reading, low-vocalizers read louder to compensate for this lack of movement so they can understand the material. When individuals undergo “feedback training”, where they are conscious of these muscle movements, this difference diminishes.

=== Role in articulation ===
Articulation during silent speech is important, though speech is not solely dependent on articulation alone. Impairing articulation can reduce sensory input from the muscle movements of the larynx to the brain to understand information being read and it also impairs ongoing speech production during reading to direct thinking. Words that are of high similarity minimize articulation, causing interference, and may reduce subvocal rehearsal. As articulation of similar words is affecting subvocalization, there is an increase in acoustic errors for short-term memory and recall.

Impairing or suppressing articulation causes a greater impact on performance. An example of articulation suppression is repeating the same word over many times such as 'the' and attempting to memorise other words into short-term memory. Even though primary cues may be given for these words in attempt to retrieve them, words will either be recalled for the incorrect cue or will not be recalled at all.

== Schizophrenia and subvocalization ==
People with schizophrenia known to experience auditory hallucinations could show the result of over-activation of the muscles in the larynx. Using an electromyography to record muscle movement, individuals experiencing hallucinations showed greater muscle activation before these hallucinations occurred. However, this muscle activation is not easily detected which means the muscle movement must be measured on a wider range. Though a wider range is needed to detect the muscle movement, it is still considered as subvocalization. Much more research is needed to link subvocalization with hallucination but many schizophrenics report "hearing voices" (as hallucinations) coming from their throat. This small fact could be a clue to finding if there is a true link between subvocalization and hallucinations, but it is very difficult to see this connection because not many patients experience hallucinations.
