= Augmented Intelligence (Christies) =

Augmented Intelligence was the first digital art auction entirely dedicated to works created by Artificial Intelligence (AI) held by a major traditional auction house, Christie's New York. The event took place online between February 20 and March 5, 2025, and generated widespread public repercussion due to a strong protest and boycott movement organized by the global artistic community.

== History and organization ==
The auction was conceived and coordinated by Christie's digital art specialists Nicole Sales Giles and Sebastian Sanchez, with physical exhibitions at Rockefeller Center in New York City. The curation brought together 34 lots spanning works by historical pioneers of computing and algorithmic art from the 1960s—such as Harold Cohen—to prominent contemporary digital and generative artists in technology, such as Refik Anadol, Sasha Stiles, Claire Silver, Sougwen Chung, and the duo Holly Herndon and Mat Dryhurst.

The catalog included a wide variety of media driven by technological tools, ranging from Convolutional Neural Networks (CNNs) and Generative Adversarial Networks (GANs) to interactive installations and robotic sculptures painting in real time.

== Controversy and protests ==
=== The open letter ===
Before bidding opened, the event faced strong opposition from professional associations and independent traditional artists. A campaign led by artists' rights activists and illustration professionals (including figures like Karla Ortiz, Reid Southen, and Kelly McKernan) published an open letter titled "Cancel the Christie's AI Art Auction". The petition gathered over 6,500 electronic support signatures.

Protesters based their call for cancellation on three main points:

- Copyright and Consent: Accusations that commercial generative AI software (such as Midjourney and Stable Diffusion) were trained by arbitrarily scraping billions of artistic images from the internet without the consent, prior licensing, or credit attribution of the original creators.
- Commercial Exploitation: The claim that large tech companies were commercially capitalizing on human-generated data to build automation systems that directly compete with the traditional professional market.
- Institutional Legitimation: The argument that the auction would institutionally validate misappropriation practices and weaken ongoing legal protections in United States courts regarding artificial intelligence.

=== Response from Christie's and artists ===
Christie's management declined to cancel the auction and issued statements defending the conceptual legitimacy of the event. The institution pointed out that the role of artificial intelligence within art history should be understood as an evolution of tools, and that the curation focused on human agency and the collaborative role exercised by the creator in manipulating code and prompts.

Some participating artists also spoke out. Some emphasized having approaches where they intentionally trained algorithms in a closed loop, using only exclusive datasets composed of their own previous works. Others, such as artist Mat Dryhurst, pointed out that their works functioned precisely as metalanguage and critical commentary on privacy issues and the open circulation of these images on the web.

== Financial results ==
Despite public protests, the auction concluded on March 5, 2025, surpassing internally estimated fundraising targets, accumulating a total sales volume of $728,784 USD. Out of 34 lots offered for sale with cryptocurrency payment options accepted, 28 were sold, representing a final conversion rate of 82%.

Top lots sold at auction
Artist(s)	Work title	Realized price (USD)
Refik Anadol	Machine Hallucinations – ISS Dreams – A	$277,200
Holly Herndon & Mat Dryhurst	Embedding Study 1 & 2	$94,500
Charles Csuri	Bspline Men	$50,400
Claire Silver	daughter	$44,100
Linda Dounia	14° 40′ 34.46″ N 17° 26′ 15.14″ W	$9,450

Demographic analysis shared by Christie's press office indicated that the event recorded 37% of new bidders who had never bought on the platform, and approximately 48% of the interested volume belonged to the Millennials and Generation Z generations.

== See also ==
- Generative art
- Artificial intelligence and copyright
