= Samuel Hubbard Shoe Company =

- Founded: 2013; 13 years ago
- Founder: Bruce R. Katz
- Headquarters: Mill Valley, California
- Products: Shoes, belts, leather products
- Number of employees: 21-50
- Website: SamuelHubbard.com

The Samuel Hubbard Shoe Company is an American footwear brand founded in 2013 by Bruce R. Katz. A co-founder of the Rockport Shoe Company, Katz founded Samuel Hubbard in Mill Valley, CA to develop premium footwear.

== History ==
The origins of the Samuel Hubbard Shoe company date back to the 1930s when Samuel J. Katz established the Hubbard Shoe Company in Rochester, NH. The company grew to more than 500 employees during the height of World War II, when it manufactured boots for the armed services. By the end of the war, government orders had slowed significantly and Samuel’s son Saul Katz joined the company to help his father rebuild.

The Hubbard Shoe Company prospered through the 1950s and 1960s, partly due to new government contracts to make ski and parachute boots during the Korean conflict. However, in the late 1960s and early 1970s, overseas manufacturing became cheaper and more readily available. Unable to compete, New England shoe factories began to dwindle and by 1973, the Hubbard Shoe Company was forced to close its doors.

In 1971, Saul Katz used $15,000 to start the Rockport Shoe Company with his son Bruce. The company embraced the concept of overseas manufacturing and pioneered the idea of the comfort shoe. Revenue grew to almost $100 million in sales before acquisition by Reebok in 1986.

When his stockpile of 24 pairs of Rockports began to run out, Katz wondered where his next pairs of shoes would come from. This, combined with the passing of his father Saul Katz in 2012 and concern that his eight year old daughter would never know the family’s shoemaking history, convinced Bruce to return to the shoe industry. The Samuel Hubbard company was founded in July 2013, the name commemorating the family legacy with the first part “Samuel” named after Bruce’s grandfather, and the second part “Hubbard” reflective of his grandfather’s company, Hubbard Shoe Co.

== Products and manufacturing ==
Samuel Hubbard is best known for the "Unsneaker", a casual and dress shoe hybrid that resembles a dress shoe on the outside, but feels like a sneaker on the inside. The company produces several dozen styles including casual shoes, dress shoes and slip-ons. In 2018, golf shoes and boat shoes were introduced.

Uppers and insoles are made from European-sourced leathers, while most models use Vibram outsoles. Manufacturing is performed in Portugal, a result of Katz’s industry connections and knowledge from his Rockport days. Shoes are sold through the company’s website, major retailers like Nordstrom and Dillards, and more than 500 independent shoe retailers across the United States.

== In popular culture ==
Samuel Hubbard shoes have been worn by Ultramarathoner Dean Karnazes and were worn by Danny Glover in the film The Old Man & the Gun. They’ve also been worn by singer Peter Gabriel, celebrity chef Brian Malarkey and former president Bill Clinton.

== Philanthropy ==
The company has sponsored the Marin Humane Society and frequently features dogs in its catalogs. For every shoe sold in the Freedom collection, $20 is donated to the News Literacy Project
