= CONFER (software) =

Computer conferencing system

- Original author: Robert Parnes
- Developers: Advertel Communication Systems, Inc.
- Release: 1975
- Written in: FORTRAN
- Operating system: MTS, Unix
- Available in: English
- Type: Computer conferencing

CONFER is one of the first computer conferencing systems. Highly sophisticated for its time, it was developed in 1975 at the University of Michigan by then graduate student Robert Parnes. The CONFER system continued to be a widely used communication tool until 1999. CONFER is the progenitor of the computer conferencing systems Caucus, PicoSpan, and YAPP.

== Origins and history ==
CONFER was developed in the mid-1970s when University of Michigan experimental psychology graduate student Bob Parnes attended a seminar where Professor Merrill M. Flood discussed aspects of electronic mail and conferencing on group decision making. Flood had a magnetic tape of a prototype system and approached Parnes about getting it to run on the Michigan Terminal System (MTS), the university's time-sharing system. Parnes declined, but offered instead to attempt writing a similar program for MTS. With encouragement from Fred Goodman and LeVerne Collet at the School of Education and Karl Zinn at the Center for Research on Learning and Teaching (CRLT), CONFER was developed.

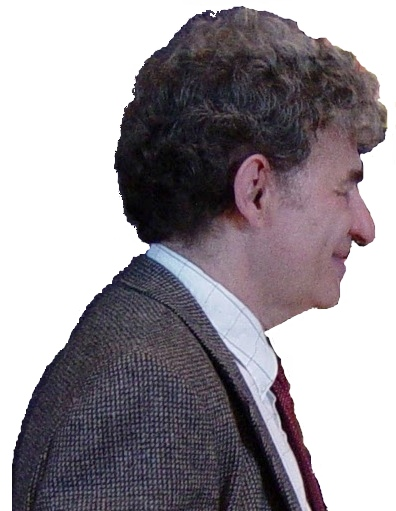
Bob Parnes, c. 2004

Because of a graduate teaching assistant strike, Parnes was temporarily relieved of his teaching duties and had some extra time to devote to his experimental system, which he called "CONFER". MTS served as an excellent development environment for CONFER, which was built on top of the MTS file structure and exploited its file sharing features. According to Parnes, "I don't think I could have written CONFER anywhere but on MTS." MTS at U-M and later at Wayne State University (WSU) was a good match for CONFER because both systems were attached to the Merit Network and thus had a broader reach within Michigan via Merit and within the U.S. and internationally via Merit's interconnections to Telenet (later SprintNet), Tymnet, ADP's Autonet, and later still the IBM Global Network and the Internet.

Parnes' vision of the system was one where the individual group participant would alternate between being a producer and being a consumer of information. The unique CONFER feature in this regard was initially the functionality of the "vote." This feature allowed the consumer to voice their "feelings" or opinion on a statement by voting.

Parnes went on to form his own company — Advertel Communication Systems, Inc. — which marketed and supported CONFER.

The CONFER system continued to be a widely used communication tool until 1999. By this time, U-M, WSU, and the University of Alberta had moved from the Michigan Terminal System to distributed computing environments and several newer digital technologies replaced the functionality provided by CONFER.

== Sites where CONFER was used ==
In addition to the University of Michigan CONFER was used at Wayne State University (WSU), the University of Alberta (UQV), Michigan State University (MSU), and at Hewlett-Packard (HP). MSU and HP both ran MTS so they could run CONFER. A Unix version, known as CONFER U, was created by the University of Michigan's Information Technology Division and used at U-M and at the Research Libraries Group. A version for the DEC VMS operating system, known as CONFER V, was created and used at Western Michigan University (WMU). The work on CONFER U at U-M and on CONFER V at WMU was done with the encouragement of and guidance from Bob Parnes.

== Features ==
CONFER provides facilities for online discussion of topics of general interest. Discussions are organized around "conferences" that focus on a topic, a group or community, or an event. Conferences may be "public" (open to anyone with an account on the host system where CONFER runs) or private (invitation only). Each conference has one or more organizers. Individuals join conferences as participants, auditors, or observers. Conferences are accessed using terminals from various locations, allowing discussion without having to meet physically or participate at the same time.

As a system developed in the mid-1970s, CONFER is a text oriented, command driven system with extensive prompts and online help. It does not have a graphical user interface (but see InfoX below) or allow the display of photographs or other graphics.

Within a conference, discussions are managed as a collection of items. One person starts an item by entering the item text and giving it a title, called a header. Other people can then make their own responses to the initial entry. The item text and each response is signed with the name of its author. The item's author can specify the type of responses desired. The most common type of response is a discussion response where the response is simply text. Participants can make as many discussion responses to an item as they like. Another type of response is a vote where a numeric response followed by an optional text comment is given with only one response per item per participant. And still another response type is a dynamic value vote.

One can view items in chronological order, reverse chronological order, or by following a thread of related items linked together using next and previous item links. One can also view specific items, a range of items, new items or items that have new responses.

To participate in a conference one must first register as a permanent participant, an auditor, or a temporary observer. A participant may contribute items and responses, while an auditor or observer just views them. Once one has joined a conference, CONFER keeps track of what has been seen for participants and auditors, but not for observers. Each time a conference is visited by a participant or auditor, CONFER displays a list of new information that has been entered since the previous visit. Of course one can always go back and look at old items and responses as well.

CONFER allows the use of pseudonyms for items, responses, and messages, and participants can register in a conference under a pseudonym. Many conferences that allow pseudonymous comments ask participants to register under their own names to establish a legitimate tone for the conference, and help establish the credibility of the participants.

Bulletins, notices that are displayed when a conference is entered with no responses allowed, are another less frequently used form of communication.

CONFER also provides a "meeting" mode to allow real-time discussions and includes facilities to support "simulations" as described below.

Not only did CONFER offer the opportunity for various forms of group discussion, it also served as the first widely used e-mail system on the Michigan campus. And while the MTS $MESSAGE e-mail system eventually surpassed CONFER as the e-mail facility of choice at Michigan, the computer conferencing portion of CONFER continued to thrive.

== Commands ==
List of CONFER commands

The following commands are supported by CONFER. Many command names and modifiers may be abbreviated using initial sub-strings of the name.

At the DO NEXT? prompt:

HELP                To see the online tutorial in CONFER II.
?                   Same as HELP.  
DESCRIPTOR [NEW]    To see the 3-line descriptors of an item or the new items.   
NEW                 To see NEW messages, items, and responses.   
ITEM n              To see a particular item, where "n" is its number. 
RESPONSES [n:m1-m2] Display responses "m1" to "m2" for items "n".
ENTER               To enter an item (public) into the conference. 
LOAD filename       To enter text from filename  
TRANSMIT            To send a message (private) to another participant. 
MESSAGE [n]         Display a message or messages.
BULLETIN            To enter a bulletin (public) for everyone to see. 
BULLETIN ALL        Display bulletins.
BULLETIN REVERSE    Display bulletins in reverse order. 
NOTE                To create a note (private) for yourself.   
INDEX               To see the index of items for the conference.   
JOIN name           To join another conference called "name". 
WAIT n              To set automatic screen pauses every "n" lines.  
CHANGE TEXT n       To change the text of item "n".
CHANGE RESPONSE n:m To change, delete, or retire response "m" of item "n". 
CHANGE RETIRE n     To retire items "n".
CHANGE RESTORE n    To unretire item "n".
CHANGE FREEZE n     To freeze (prevent more responses) item "n". 
CHANGE BULLETIN     Change the text of a bulletin.
CHANGE INTRODUCTION Change the participant's introduction.
CHANGE NAME         Change the participant's name.
CHANGE PHONE        Change the participant's phone number.
CHANGE RESIGN       Resign from the current conference.
PARTICIPANT         Display participant information.
PARTICIPANT ALL     Display participant information.
PARTICIPANT name    Display participant information.
DELETE n            Delete item "n" (organizer only).
STOP                To return to MTS command mode (#).   
QUIT                To end your conferencing session and to SIGN OFF. 

At the RESPOND, FORGET OR PASS? prompt:

HELP       To see the online tutorial in CONFER II. 
?          Same as HELP.  
RESPOND    To enter a response to that item.   
FORGET     To tell CONFER to stop showing you that item.   
PASS       To pass your turn at making a response.   
TEXT       To display the text of the item again.   
-n         To display the last "n" (an integer) responses.  
n          To display response "n" through the last response.  
n ONLY     To display only response "n".  
MINE       To display all the responses you've made on an item.  
TRANSMIT   See above.   
ENTER      See above.   
BULL       See above.   
NOTE       See above.   
NEW        To label the responses new again.   
NEW STOP   To label the responses new and return to DO NEXT?  
STOP       To return to the DO NEXT? prompt.

Enter RESPOND to be prompted to enter the text of a response. CONFER formats responses, so entering very long lines do not cause problems. A null line is entered to complete a response and CONFER then prompts with a question of the form:

EDIT, VIEW, CANCEL, MORE, OR DONE:

To which there are several possible responses:

DONE    Enter the response (the default)
EDIT    Edit the response by invoking the MTS File Editor
VIEW    Display the current text of the response
MORE    Add more text to the response
CANCEL  Cancel the response and discard the text
?       Ask for assistance

The complete form of the ITEM command is:

 ITEM  [item-list]  [modifier [modifer [...] ] ]

where item-list selects the items to print and takes the following forms:

n               item “n”
n1,n2,n3,...    items “n1”, “n2”, and “n3” (a list of items)
n1−n2           items “n1” through “n2” (a range of items)
n:m             item “n” with response “m”
n:m1,m2,m3,...  item “n” with responses “m1”, “m2”, and “m3” (a list of responses)
n:m1−m2         item “n” with responses “m1” through “m2” of item “n” (a range of responses)
NEXT            the next item
PREVIOUS        the previous item
LAST            the last (highest numbered) item
ALL             all items
NEW             all new items (not yet seen)

If the item list is omitted, only new items are displayed.

The following modifiers may be appended to the ITEM and many other commands:

BROWSE              print only the first two lines of each response
FORGET              stop showing this item and its responses
NOFORGET            display items even if they have been forgotten
HEADER              print the 1-line title instead of 3-line descriptor
LIFO                print the responses in reverse chronological order
NODescriptor        do not print the 3-line descriptor
NOResponse          do not print the responses
NOText              do not print the text of the item
PASS                automatically pass each item
REVERSE             print the items in reverse order (highest number first)
*DUMMY*             discard the output of the item and mark it as “seen”
*PRINT*             directs output to a printer
*FILE*=filename     directs output to a file

== Examples ==
CONFER examples

Several simple examples of CONFER use are shown below. Text shown as bold italic is user input. All other text is output.

Example 1: Start CONFER and view new items and enter a response to an item:

#source wabc:project-x
#$Run CNFR:CONFER t=5 par=WABC:PROJECT-X
#Execution begins
 Confer II (08/89) - designed by Robert Parnes
 Copyright & Trademark: Advertel Communication Systems
 CONFERence for WABC:PROJECT-X
 Marlou Smith, organizer
 New item: 1
 No new responses
 No new messages
 DO NEXT? new
 Item 1 14:38 Nov10/90 4 lines 1 response
 Marlou Smith
 A new beginning!
 This notice is to introduce you to our new Project-X
 conference. Please join our conference and respond
 to this item to indicate that you have successfully
 joined. Thank you.
 1 response
 Nov10/90 14:42
 1:1) John Brown: Thank you for the invitation. I am
 now a member.
 RESPOND, FORGET, OR PASS: respond
 GIVE YOUR RESPONSE
> Yes! I too am now a member.
> {return}'  [a null or empty line]
 EDIT, VIEW, CANCEL, MORE, OR DONE: done
 This is response 1:2
 DO NEXT?

Example 2: Enter a new item for discussion:

 DO NEXT? enter
 ENTER NUMBER OF ITEM THAT MOST INSPIRED THIS ITEM: 1
 ENTER YOUR TEXT
> This is the first line of text in a new item
> And this is the second and last line of text in the item
> {return}  [a null or empty line]
 EDIT, VIEW, CANCEL, MORE, OR DONE: done
 ENTER THE HEADER FOR YOUR ITEM ON ONE LINE
 A new beginning!
 OK TO USE DISCUSSION RESPONSES? ok
 Your item preparation is now complete.
 OK TO ENTER THIS INTO WABC:Project-X? ok
 Your entry is now ITEM 2
 DO NEXT?

Example 3: Post a new bulletin that will be shown to all members of the conference:

 DO NEXT? bulletin
  YOU MAY POST A SHORT BULLETIN
- There will be a short meeting tomorrow for all members of Project-X
- in West Conference room at 2 pm.
- {return}  [a null or empty line]
 EDIT, VIEW, CANCEL, MORE, OR DONE: {return}  [a null or empty line]
 EFFECTIVE DATE: {return}
 EXPIRATION DATE: {return}
 Bulletin has been posted.
 Marlou Smith Effective: Nov19/90 Expires: Nov26/90
 There will be a short meeting tomorrow for all members of Project-X
 in West Conference room at 2 pm.
 DO NEXT?

Example 4: Transmit a private message to another participant:

 DO NEXT? transmit
 ENTER YOUR MESSAGE
> I am sending you a test message. Do you read me?
> {return}
 EDIT, VIEW, CANCEL, MORE, OR DONE: {return}
 ENTER RECIPIENT: john brown
 OK TO SEND TO JOHN BROWN? ok
 Message sent at 13:11 Nov18/90
 ENTER ANOTHER RECIPIENT (or press RETURN):
 {return}
 DO NEXT?

Example 5: View a private message from another participant:

 New message: 2
 DO NEXT? message
 - Message 2 3 lines 13:12:41 Nov18/90
 MESSAGE from: Jack Black 13:11 Nov18/90 WXYZ:MF
 I am sending you a test message. Do you read me?
 Jack
 REPLY, DELETE, OR IGNORE: reply
 ENTER YOUR REPLY
 > I read you loud and clear!
 > John
 > {return}
 EDIT, VIEW, CANCEL, MORE, OR DONE: done
 OK TO SEND TO JACK BLACK? ok
 Message sent at 13:12 Nov18/90
 ENTER ANOTHER RECIPIENT (or press RETURN):
 {return}
 Continuing with message 2 from Jack Black
 DELETE OR SAVE: delete
 Deleted
 DO NEXT?

Example 6: Finish the CONFER session and sign off from MTS:

 DO NEXT? stop
#Execution terminated
#signoff

== InfoX ==
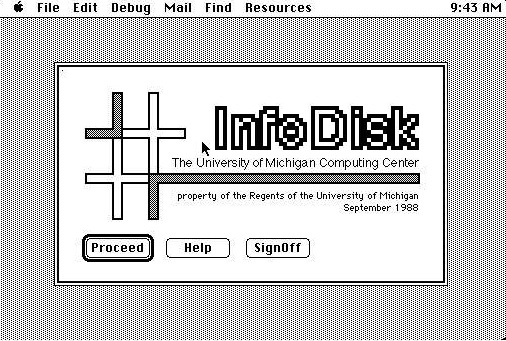
Screenshot of the InfoDisk About window, September 1988

InfoX (pronounced “info-ex”, originally InfoDisk) is a program for the Apple Macintosh running Classic MacOS, developed by the Information Technology Division at the University of Michigan. It provides a modern user interface (menus, icons, windows, and buttons) that can be used to check electronic mail, participate in CONFER II conferences, access the MTS User Directory, and create, edit, and manipulate files. InfoX adds Macintosh-style word processing features to the more traditional editing functions available from the CONFER command-line interface. One can use the standard Cut, Copy, and Paste commands under the Macintosh Edit menu to move text from any Macintosh file to a conference entry or message. Text is automatically wrapped text in conference entries and messages.

InfoX allows users to join a conference, enter or respond to an item, read a particular item or response, forget an item, or mark all items as seen. Unseen conference items are displayed in much the same way messages are displayed, so one can select an item by title, not just by item number. When a conference folder is opened, InfoX displays a variety of information about new items and new responses. The buttons at the top of the screen allow the user to join a conference, read any item, enter a new item, forget an item, and mark all items as seen.

Some CONFER II functions are not available through InfoX. One cannot use the program to enter organizer-defined commands, post or read bulletins, hold meetings, use polled or numeric responses, enter pseudonymous or anonymous responses, change entries, access the index or summaries, or send or receive CONFER messages. Because InfoX does not allow for many conference management features, organizers and advanced users choose to access conferences through the traditional CONFER II command-line interface.

== Uses ==
The U-M Center for Research on Learning and Teaching (CRLT) was an early sponsor and proponent of CONFER and saw great promise in it for expanding learning environments.

The first major "test" for the CONFER system was the October 1976 International Society for Technology Assessment (ISTA) Conference held in Ann Arbor. Karl Zinn from U-M's CRLT was interested in testing the technology to facilitate the coordination of tasks among the conference staff as well as using the system to allow conference participants to extend discussions on conference topics. CONFER provided a new opportunity for group discussion and is credited for playing a "tremendous role in enlarging the electronic community" at the University of Michigan.

Those providing user support for the Merit Network in Michigan, particularly Chris Wendt, were excited by the potential for CONFER, and they created the statewide MNET:Caucus conference to help Merit users get quick answers to their questions and take some of the load off their consulting staff. The participants — both consultants and users — learned a lot from each other through the conference.

CONFER continued to gain in popularity with faculty, students, administrators, and staff through the 1980s. The following papers give a hint at the range of activities for which CONFER was used.

- "Computer-based educational communications at the University of Michigan", Proceedings of the ACM Annual Conference/Meeting, 1976
- A Meeting-related Information Exchange Facility within a computer conferencing environment, 1977, Committee for Information on Science and Technology (CIDST) of the Commission of the European Communities
- "Third party consulting in the network environment", CHI '81 Proceedings of the joint conference on Easier and more productive use of computer systems, 1981
- "The CONFER experience of the Merit Computer Network", CHI '81 Proceedings of the joint conference on Easier and more productive use of computer systems, 1981
- "Uses of CONFER at Wayne State University", CHI '81 Proceedings of the joint conference on Easier and more productive use of computer systems, 1981
- "Computer conference and message systems: Their use in a university computer center", Proceedings of the 9th annual ACM SIGUCCS conference on User services, 1981
- "Is It Time for CONFER, a Computer-Based Conference for Dental Public Health?", Journal of Public Health Dentistry, 1984

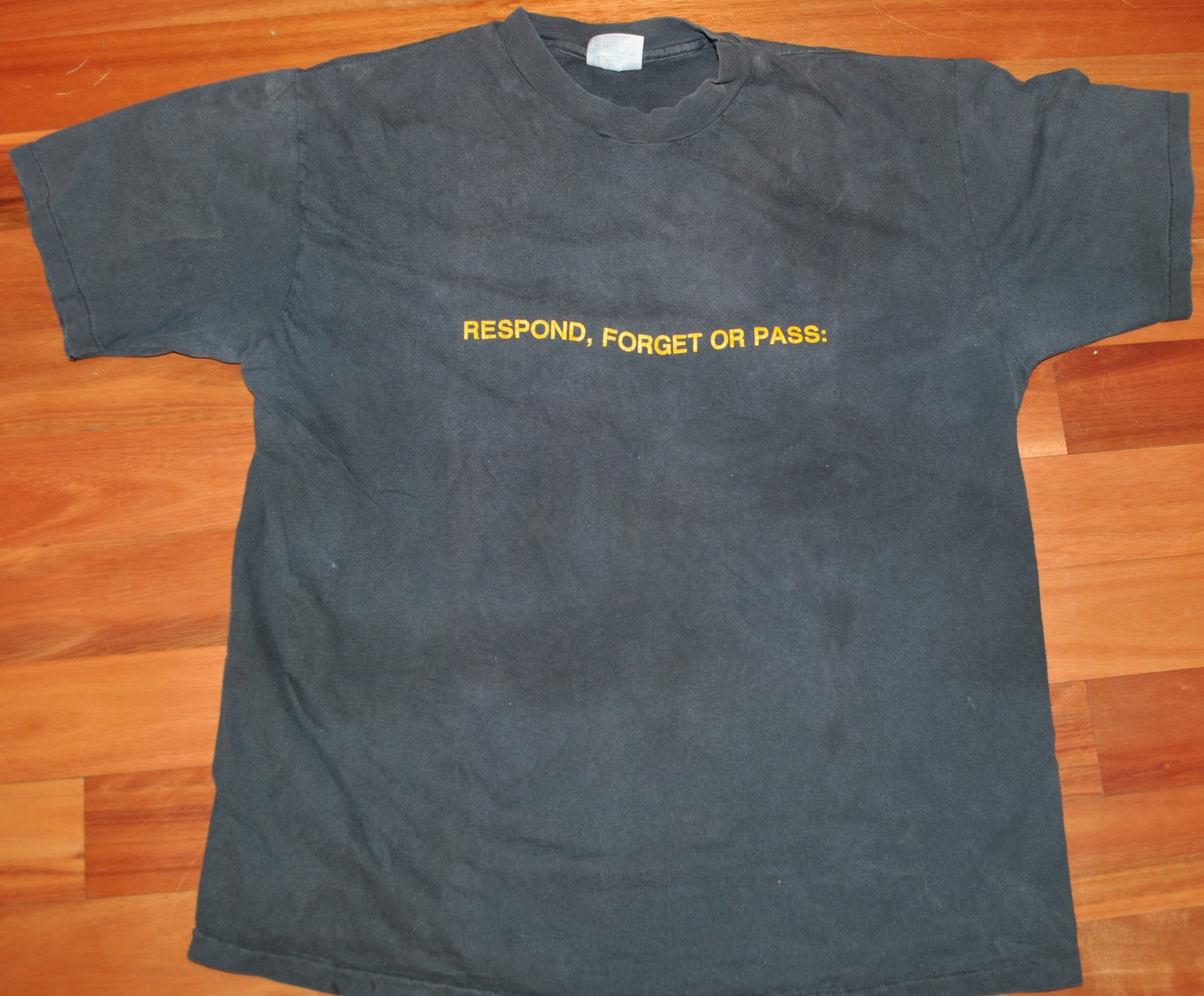
RESPOND, FORGET OR PASS:

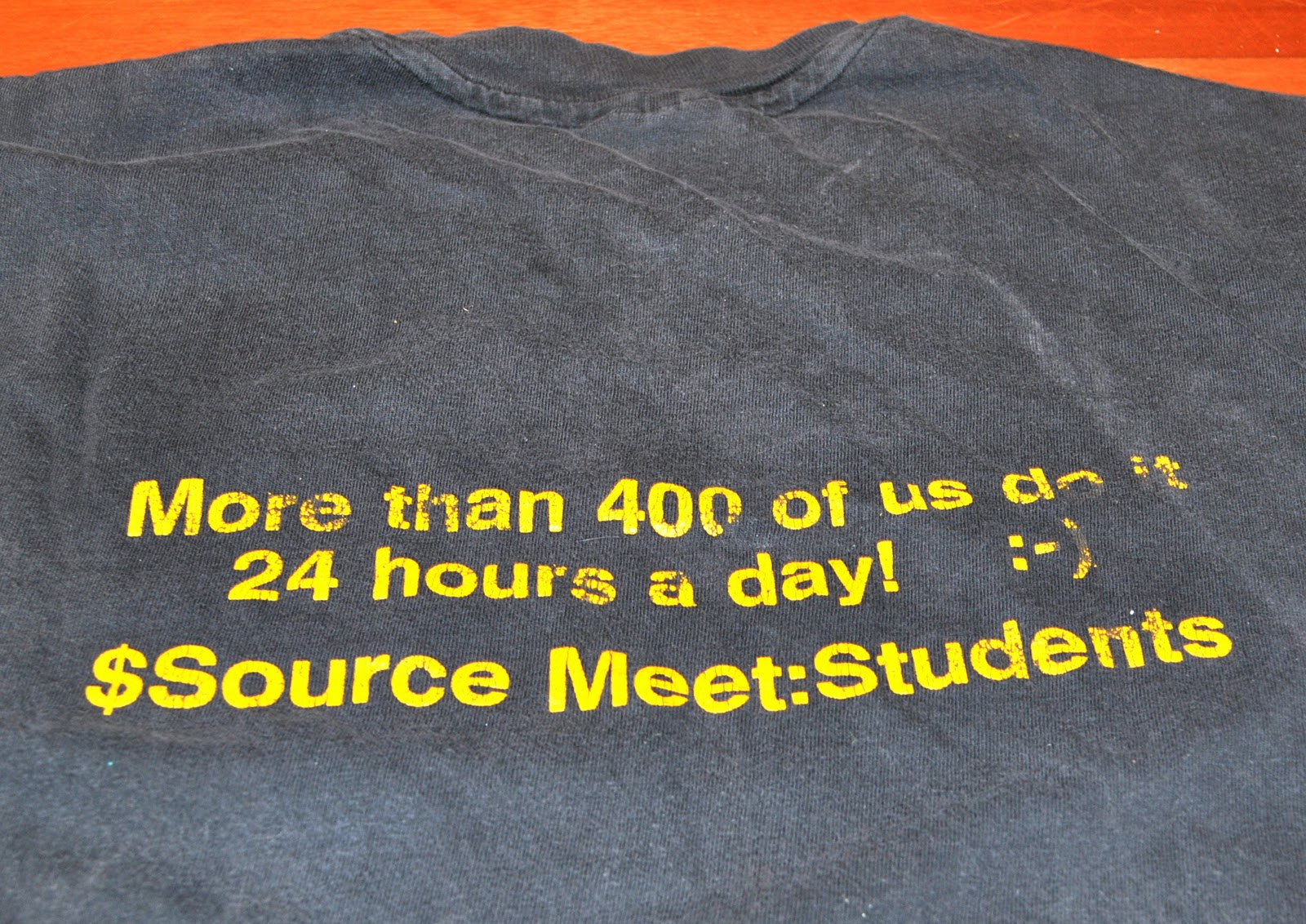
More than 400 of us do it 24 hours a day! :-) $Source Meet:Students

- "The Design and Implementation of a Statewide Perinatal Automated Medical Network for Michigan (PAM/NET)", Proceedings of the Annual Symposium on Computer Application in Medical Care, 1985
- "Using Computers to Teach Writing", U-M Computing News, 1986, describes how Richard Meisler, Lecturer in U-M's Department of English, uses CONFER to effectively teach students how to write
- "Politics and Computers", U-M Computing News, 1986, describes the use of Confer by Fred Goodman and Edgar Taylor of the U-M School of Education, and Raymond Tanter in Political Science at U-M, in their courses Poli Sci 471, "American Foreign Policy Process" and Poli Sci 353, "Arab-Israeli Conflict"
- "Computer conferencing for accounting instruction", Journal of Accounting Education, 1989
- "The Integration of Computer Conferencing into the Medical School Curriculum", Medical Teacher, 1989
- "Institutional Gaming through the use of Computer Conferencing", Empowering networks: computer conferencing in education, 1992
- "Connecting the University and the Field of Practice", Empowering networks: computer conferencing in education, 1992
- "Uses of Electronic Communication to Document an Academic Community: A Research Report", Archivaria 38, 1994
- "Crisscrossing Grand canyon: Bridging the gaps with computer conferencing", Computers and Composition, 1995

In 1985, a group of U-M students established the first computer conference exclusively for students called MEET:STUDENTS. This conference marked, in a sense, the acceptance of online communications as a culturally accepted mode for student communication and exchange.

For many on the Michigan campus and elsewhere, the benefits of CONFER included meeting new people with similar interests, engaging in group discussion, and communicating outside the normal parameters defined by time and space. CONFER played a tremendous role in enlarging the electronic community at the university and in removing the traditional geographic borders of the classroom and campus. Said Parnes, "CONFER enabled a lot of people to talk together who wouldn't have otherwise."

== Legacy ==
There is a group of computer conferencing programs whose designs were derived from CONFER which are sometimes called "WELL-style" systems, because The WELL has been very influential in spreading this design. WELL-style systems facilitate group discussion by treating discussion items as part of an ongoing conversation with an inherent structure. The conversations are organized as linear chains of items and responses with individual items and responses displayed as a continuous stream of text.

Examples of WELL-style Web conferencing software include: Backtalk, Caucus, COW, Motet, PicoSpan, Web crossing, WELL Engaged, and YAPP. Because of its influence on these programs, CONFER has had a strong influence on most of the major computer conferencing, blogs, social networking, and other similar programs and sites that followed.

== Documentation ==
- MTS Volume 23: Messaging and Conferencing in MTS
- Confer and MTS Help, ITD Reference R1042, October 1, 1989 (1 page)
- Computer Conferencing Guidelines, ITD Reference R1043, October 1, 1989 (2 pages)
- Guidelines for Effective Conferencing for Organizers, ITD Reference R1044, October 1, 1989 (8 pages)
- Guidelines for Effective Conferencing for Participants, ITD Reference R1045, October 1, 1989 (5 pages)
- The Beginner's Guide to Confer II (approximately 40 pages)
- An Intro Guide to Using Confer II (approximately 15 pages)
- The Reference Guide to Confer II (approximately 100 pages)
- The Organizer's Guide to Confer II (approximately 75 pages)
- The Quick Reference Card for Confer II (2 pages)
- A summary of Confer commands (2 pages)
- A guide for using Confer with multiple user IDs (3 pages)
- A guide for the program CNFR:CHECK which monitors conference activity (3 pages)
