= Bruce Katz (disambiguation) =

Bruce Katz (1952) is an American musician who plays piano, organ and bass guitar.

Bruce Katz may also refer to:

- Bruce J. Katz (born 1959), American urban planner
- Bruce R. Katz (born 1947), American entrepreneur
