= Coltrane Curtis =

Coltrane Curtis is the Founder and Managing Partner of Team Epiphany, a full-service consumer marketing agency specializing in brand strategy; experiential marketing; millennial, multicultural and influencer engagement; social media amplification and public relations, with offices in New York City and Portland, Oregon.

Prior to founding Team Epiphany Coltrane Curtis served as Vice President of Marketing for Marc Ecko Enterprises for eight years, while simultaneously operating as editor of Complex Magazine and was a founding member of G-Unit apparel.

Following his role at Ecko, Coltrane Curtis was an MTV/Viacom VJ and television personality. He became known for his red carpet fashion critiques. Curtis had a recurring role on both the MTV Video Music Awards and MTV Movie Awards. In 2007, Coltrane Curtis was named spokesperson for the Rockport Shoe company.

He is an alumnus of Morehouse College in Atlanta, Georgia.
