= Tom Mandel =

Tom Mandel may refer to:

- Tom Mandel (futurist) (1946–1995), American futurist and author
- Tom Mandel (poet) (born 1942), American poet
- Tommy Mandel (born 1949), American keyboardist

== See also ==
- Thomas Mandl (born 1979), Austrian football goalkeeper
