= PicoSpan =

- PicoSpan interface, viewed through Konsole after connecting to Grex via Secure Shell
- Developer: Marcus D. Watts
- Release: 1983
- Written in: C
- Operating system: Unix
- Available in: English
- Type: Bulletin board system
- License: Commercial proprietary software

PicoSpan was a popular computer conferencing tool written by Marcus D. Watts for the Altos 68000. It was written in 1983 for M-Net, which was owned and operated by Mike Myers. Sometime in 1984, Marcus's employer, an Ann Arbor company called Network Technologies International (NETI), purchased the rights for PicoSpan planning to develop it into a commercial product called E-Forum.

== History ==
Computer conferencing was first pioneered in Michigan on CONFER, PicoSpan, E-Forum, Caucus and Participate.

== Functionality and impact ==
PicoSpan tried to provide CONFER's functionality while using the least amount of resources, though many users found it hard to use. It formed the basis for many conferencing systems run by hobbyists. and commercial ventures

Picospan came with a toolbox of software customization utilities that could be used to make changes at the system and user level. It was tightly integrated with Unix and could provide transparent access to many external programs that formed a part of the Unix environment. Typing "unix" at the Pico prompt put the user in a shell and users could rapidly switch back and forth and move text from one to the other.

PicoSpan also permitted the linking of discussion threads into multiple conferences, at the same time, so that multiple groups could participate. On a big BBS with many users, not all conferences are followed, so it's advantageous if the more interesting discussions are cross-linked.

PicoSpan also displays responses as a single integrated thread rather than a collection of separately displayed responses. It relied on constrained choices: no one could start a new topic merely by responding to an old post, so discussions and topics didn't fragment. You couldn't respond to an individual's post and had to respond to the whole thread, forcing people to stay coherent and on-topic. However many people found it hard to use, because of its plain-text environment and steep learning curve.

Users normally dialed into the BBS over slow and flaky telephone lines. After providing the system with a name and password, they invoked Pico and brought up a long list of conference names like "Theology", "Arts", "Singles", "Twilight", "Health" and various other computer topics which were in turn grouped into themes like "Entertainment" or "Computers". The user could then type a command with the conference name as an argument and enter the conference. Once inside, they would find a series of numbered topics or threads each created by a user and each representing an asynchronous conversation. They could then post his comments.

The WELL still provides Picospan access, via Secure Shell, and the Engaged graphical user interface still uses the Picospan database of Unix files. Marcus Watts had a direct effect on The WELL's culture: PicoSpan prevented censorship by preventing conference hosts (who are empowered to hide or delete any response posted in their forum) from influencing a discussion, by labeling such posts as being "<censored>".
