= YOYOW =

Acronym on the Internet

YOYOW is an acronym for a phrase coined by Stewart Brand when he launched The WELL, short for "You Own Your Own Words". It is a storied example of Internet slang.

Members of The WELL have fought about the implications of the term for many years. In the book "The Well: A story of love, death and real life in the seminal online community," historian Katie Hafner quotes Brand as saying, "I was doing the usual thing of considering what could go wrong... One of the things that could go wrong would be people blaming us for things that people said on The Well. And the way I figured you get around that was to put the responsibility on the individual. It meant that you're responsible for your own words, and if you libel somebody they sue you, not us. And what that turned into was copyright insanity, where people thought that their precious words should not be copied in other contexts."

Beyond The WELL, this term has also been interpreted variously over the years. In March 2007, Chris Locke used it to defend refusing to remove trolling that Kathy Sierra reported as threatening messages that made her afraid to leave her house, but defending removing the whole site instead. On her blog, Creating Passionate Users, she denounced a pattern of intimidation. Chris Locke stated that his motivation for not removing hurtful posts was inspired by YOYOW.

The WELL now has a more specific (and longer) members agreement.
