= The WELL =

Virtual community

Whole Earth 'Lectronic Link
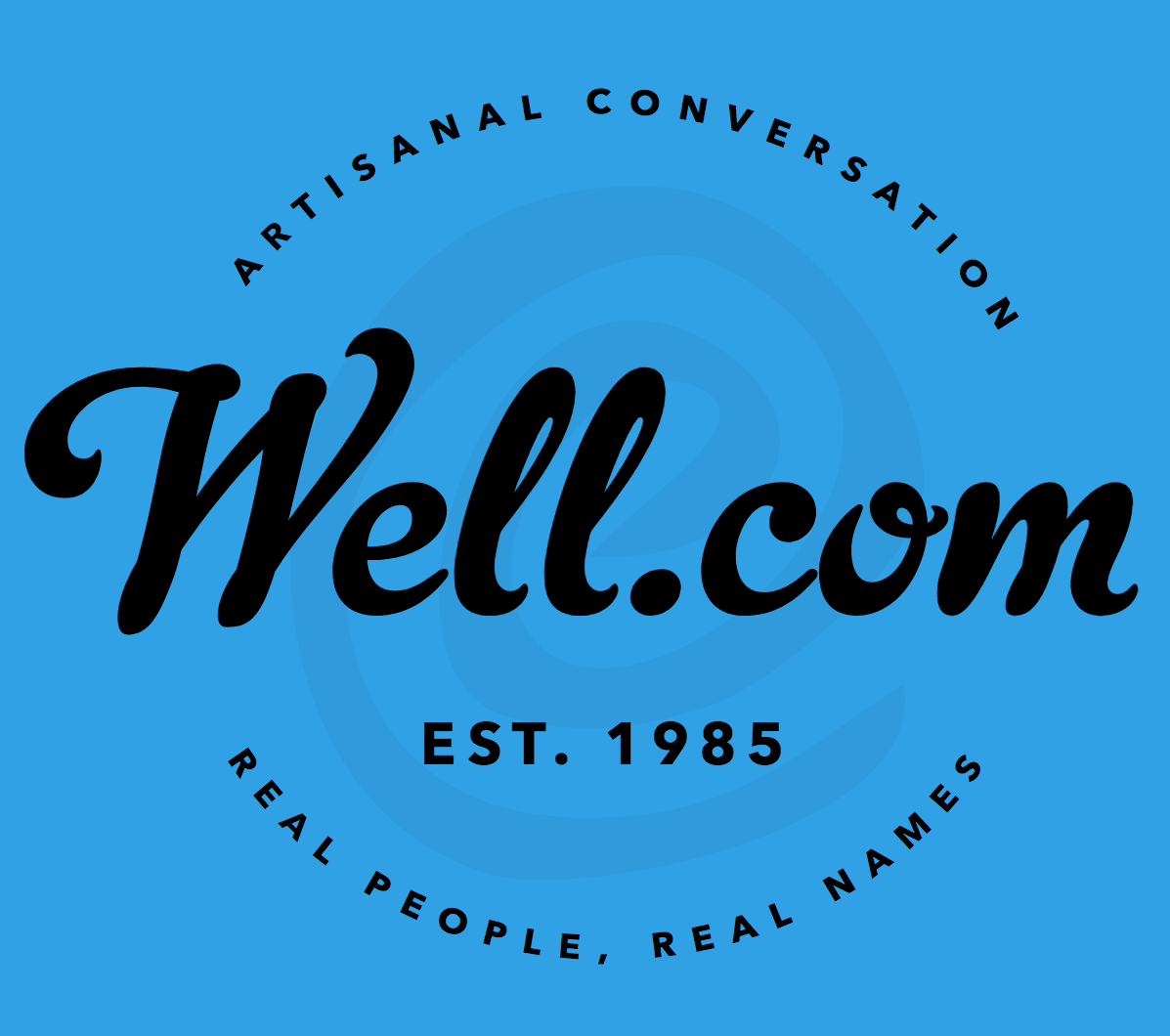
- Website type: Virtual community
- Available in: English
- Owner: The WELL Group Inc.
- Website: well.com
- Launched: February 1985; 41 years ago

The Whole Earth 'Lectronic Link, normally shortened to The WELL or The Well, is a virtual community founded in 1985. It is one of the oldest continuously operating virtual communities. By 1993 it had 7,000 members, a staff of 12, and gross annual income of $2 million. A 1997 feature in Wired magazine called it "The world's most influential online community." In 2012, when it was last publicly offered for sale, it had 2,693 members. It is best known for its Internet forums, but also provides email, shell accounts, and web pages. Discussion topics are organized into conferences that cover broad areas of interest. User anonymity is prohibited.

== History ==
The WELL was started by Stewart Brand and Larry Brilliant in 1985. The name follows the naming of some of Brand's earlier projects, including the Whole Earth Catalog. Initially The WELL was owned 50% by The Point Foundation, publishers of the Whole Earth Catalog and Whole Earth Review, and 50% by NETI Technologies Inc. a Vancouver-based company of which Larry Brilliant was at that time chairman. Its original management team—Matthew McClure, soon joined by Cliff Figallo and John Coate—collaborated with its early users to foster a sense of virtual community. McClure, Coate and Figallo were all veterans of the 1970s commune called The Farm.

The WELL was a California-run enterprise in 1998 and before. The initial pricing structure of $2 an hour for a dial-up connection meant early membership was concentrated in the San Francisco Bay Area.

John Coate left the WELL to help create SFGate, the San Francisco Chronicle's first Web site. In 1991 Figallo hired Gail Ann Williams as a community manager. Williams, one of the principals of the satirical group the Plutonium Players, had been working in nonprofit theater management and was already an active member of the WELL.

In 1992 Cliff Figallo also left his job at The WELL and long time WELL member Maurice Weitman was hired as general manager. Figallo's resignation letter to the Board cited changes in company approach: "I am too much identified with the permissive and accommodating attitude that has been part of The Well's growth to preside over a more restrictive régime."

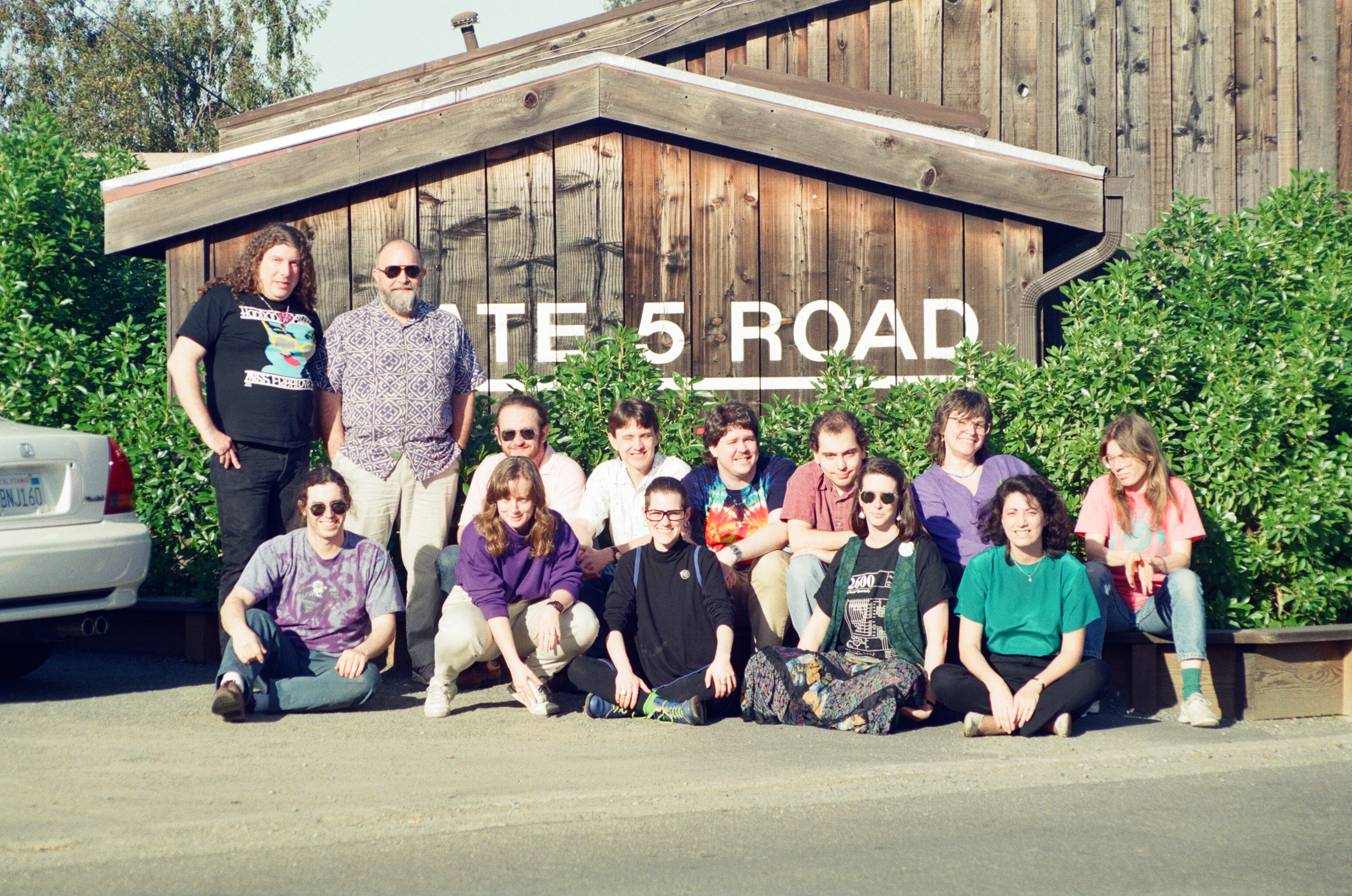
Staff of The WELL on March 7, 1993, at 27 Gate Five Road, Sausalito, California

From 1994 to 1999 The WELL was owned by Bruce R. Katz, founder of Rockport, a manufacturer of walking shoes. Katz upgraded the infrastructure and hired staff, but alarmed members with plans to franchise the WELL. "Let's just say there was a communications mismatch," Howard Rheingold wrote.

In April 1999 it was acquired by Salon, several of whose founders, such as Scott Rosenberg, had previously been regular participants there. Wired reported, "The surprise move... gives Salon a dose of new credibility by tying it directly into a members-only community of scores of artists, writers, thinkers, scientists, programmers, and visionaries."

In August 2005 Salon announced that it was looking for a buyer for The WELL, to concentrate on other business lines. In November 2006, a press release from The WELL said "As Salon has not found a suitable purchaser, it has determined that it is currently in the best interest of the company to retain this business and has therefore suspended all efforts to sell The WELL."

In June 2012 Salon once again announced that it was looking for a buyer for The WELL as its subscriber base "did not bear financial promise". Salon also announced that it had entered into discussions with various parties interested in buying the well.com domain name and that the remaining WELL staff had been laid off at the end of May. The community pledged money to take over The WELL itself and rehire important staff.

In September 2012, Salon sold The WELL to a new corporation, The WELL Group Inc., owned by eleven investors who were all long-time members. The sale price was reported to be $400,000. Members have no official role in the management, but "can ... go back to what they do best: conversation. And complaining about the management." The CEO was Earl Crabb, a programmer and supporter of the Bay Area folk music community, who died on February 20, 2015. No announcement was made as to his successor.

== Technology and Structure ==
The original hardware for the WELL was a VAX 11/750, which cost "a quarter of a million dollars and required a closet full of telephone lines and modems." The WELL's core conferencing software, PicoSpan, is written in the C programming language and runs on Unix. PicoSpan was written by Marcus D. Watts for Network Technologies International (NETI). A license for PicoSpan, in exchange for a half interest in the company, was part of NETI's initial investment in The WELL (along with the VAX computer running the mt Xinu variant of Unix). In 1996, the WELL began also using and licensing the "Engaged" conferencing software, which was built on top of PicoSpan and provides a Web-based user interface which requires less technological expertise from users. The Wall Street Journal was among the websites reported to use Engaged for online community.

The WELL's conferencing system is organized into forums reflecting member interests, and include arts, health, business, regions, hobbies, spirituality, music, politics, games, software and many more. These community forums, known as conferences, are supervised by conference hosts who guide conversations and may enforce conference rules on civility and/or appropriateness. Initially all hosts were selected by staff members. In 1995, Gail Ann Williams changed the policies to enable user-created forums. Participants can create their own independent personal conferences—either viewable by any WELL member or privately viewable by those members on a restricted membership list—on any subject they please with any rules they like. Public conferences are open to all members, while private conferences are restricted to a list of users controlled by the conference hosts. Some "featured private" or "private independent" conferences (such as "Women on the WELL" and "Recovery") are listed in the WELL's directory and members may request admission to such conferences. Within the conferences, logged-in members can see the real name of the author of each post. The intent is to foster a more intimate community through "people taking responsibility for opinions, obsessions, insights, silliness, and an occasional faux pas."

Women form a large percentage of the WELL's user community, and play strong leadership roles. "[A]lthough women made up only 10 percent of people going online, they constituted 40 percent of the population on the WELL."

Initially, in 1985, the WELL was a dial-up bulletin board system (BBS) influenced by EIES. Access to the WELL was via computer modem and phone line, then, when the Internet opened to commercial traffic in the 1990s, the WELL became one of the original dial-up gateway ISPs to provide access to it. Over time, Web technology evolved and support for dial-up access was dropped. Today users access the WELL via SSH or the Web.

In addition to its conferencing services, the WELL also provided access to the Unix operating system for people who did not have access to an institutional or corporate computer network, and management encouraged members to make and share Unix tools. This was described by early community manager John Coate as an early expression of what would later be called "maker culture." Reflecting back on that era in 1993, Howard Rheingold said that these factors made it an attractive environment for "young computer wizards".

== Policy and governance ==
Many early writings about the WELL stress members’ attempts to test utopian forms of self-government in the online community. Kevin Kelly recalled the original goal was for the WELL to be cheap, open-ended, self-governing and self-designing. Cliff Figallo said the "exercise of free speech and assembly in online interaction is among the most significant and important uses of electronic networking," and hoped that the WELL would be a grass-roots alternative to "electronic consumer shopping malls." But members were shaken in 1990 when one popular and active member "scribbled" (deleted) all his posts, then died by suicide, despite other members’ attempts to reach out to him. A few years later, two members involved in a messy real-life relationship posted about it across several conferences, dividing the community and ultimately becoming a central narrative device for Katie Hafner's book about the WELL. "People who had to live with each other, because they were all veteran addicts of the same social space, found themselves disliking one another," Howard Rheingold wrote.

In retrospect, Gail Ann Williams said the "cyber utopianism" of the founders may have always been overly optimistic. Although the ideal was egalitarian and democratic, the early pricing structure charged users based on their time spent connected to the service, which might have allowed wealthier users to dominate the conversations in what Williams called a "postocracy." Thomas Valovic, then a research manager with International Data Corporation and adjunct faculty at Northeastern University, theorized that a "single articulate and entertaining person" might be able to steer a discussion through "sheer number of postings," and that this tactic could be used effectively to spread propaganda: "The same, of course, is true of other online systems." Valovic also noted that this early pricing structure gave an edge to people whose work subsidized their time on the WELL. For journalists whose work encouraged them to be online, the distinction between public and private discourse became blurred in WELL conversations, and it was not always easy to tell when people were speaking in their official roles: "[...]the online environment has a way of homogenizing work and play to the point that separating the two becomes increasingly difficult." The WELL's utopianism was also challenged by its sale to Bruce Katz, whose vision for the company was more corporate. In her 1994 essay, “Pandora's Vox,” WELL member Carmen Hermosillo observed that by posting her thoughts and feelings where an online platform could profit from them, "I had commodified myself."

On the other hand, during a panel at the 1994 Conference on Human Factors in Computing Systems, Figallo reported that "encouraging the formation of core groups of users who shared their desire for minimal social disruption" had been generally successful in promoting free discussion without the need for heavy-handed intervention by management. Looking back in a 2007 interview with Rolling Stone, Stewart Brand said, "Communes failed, drugs went nowhere, free love led pretty directly to AIDS. ...But the counterculture approach to computers – which was of great ingenuity and great enthusiasm, and great disinterest in either corporate or government approaches to their problems – absolutely flourished, and to a large extent created the Internet and the online revolution."

Stewart Brand's original member agreement was, "You Own Your Own Words" or “YOYOW”). Gail Ann Williams recalled the phrase had a number of different interpretations: In an era when it was uncertain how laws applied to online content. Brand intended it to place legal responsibility for posts on the people who wrote them, she said. But “a lot of people saw it as being about property, that it was about copyright, and other people saw it as meaning you have to own up to your words, if you say something heinous, it won't go away, you're going to have to live it down." Currently, the agreement notes members have both the rights to their posted words and the responsibility for those words. Members can also delete their posts at any time, but a placeholder indicates the former location and author of a deleted or "scribbled" post, as well as who deleted it.

== Cultural impact ==
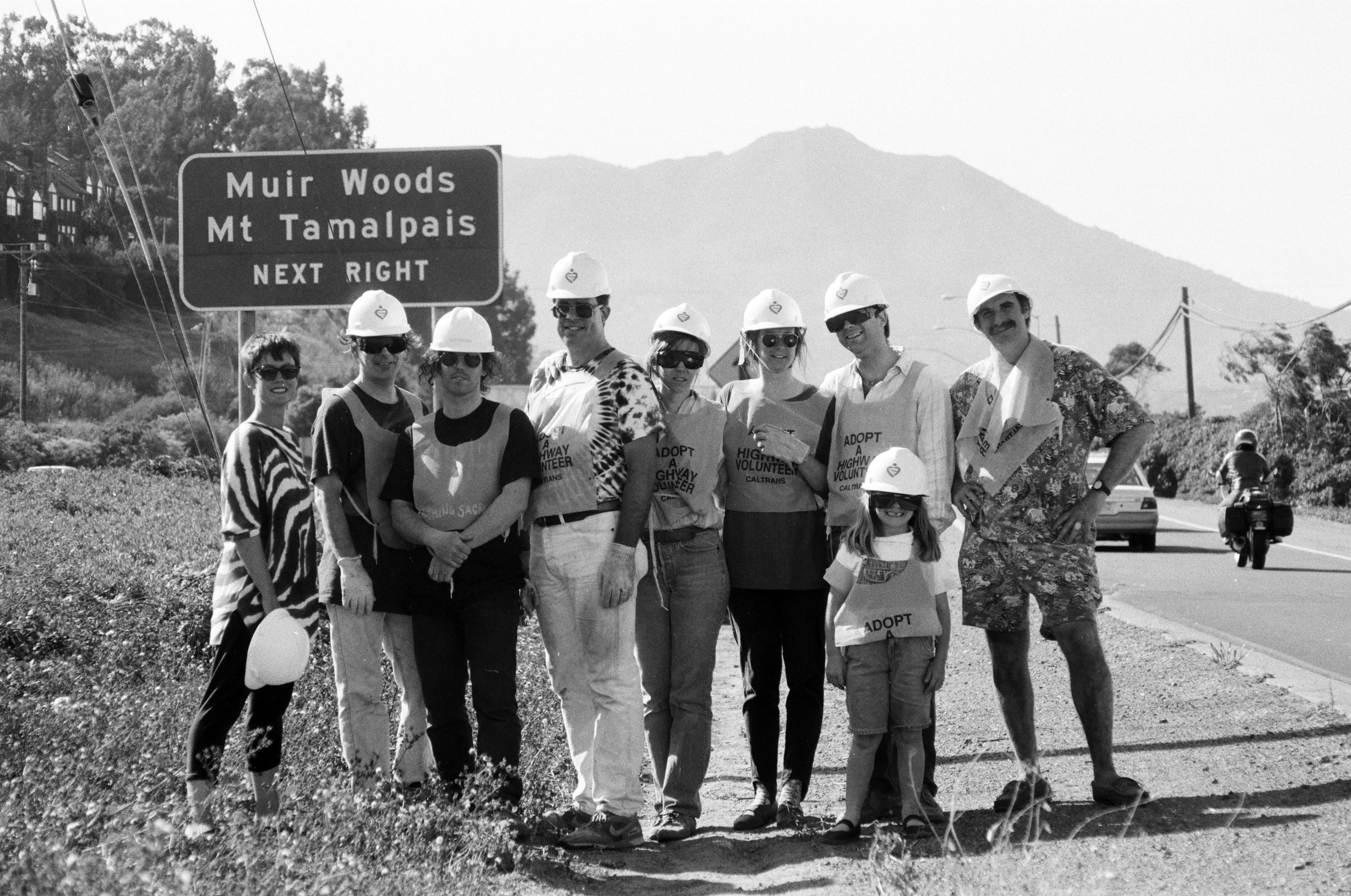
WELL users after a day spent working to re-plant a part of the roadside near the WELL office.

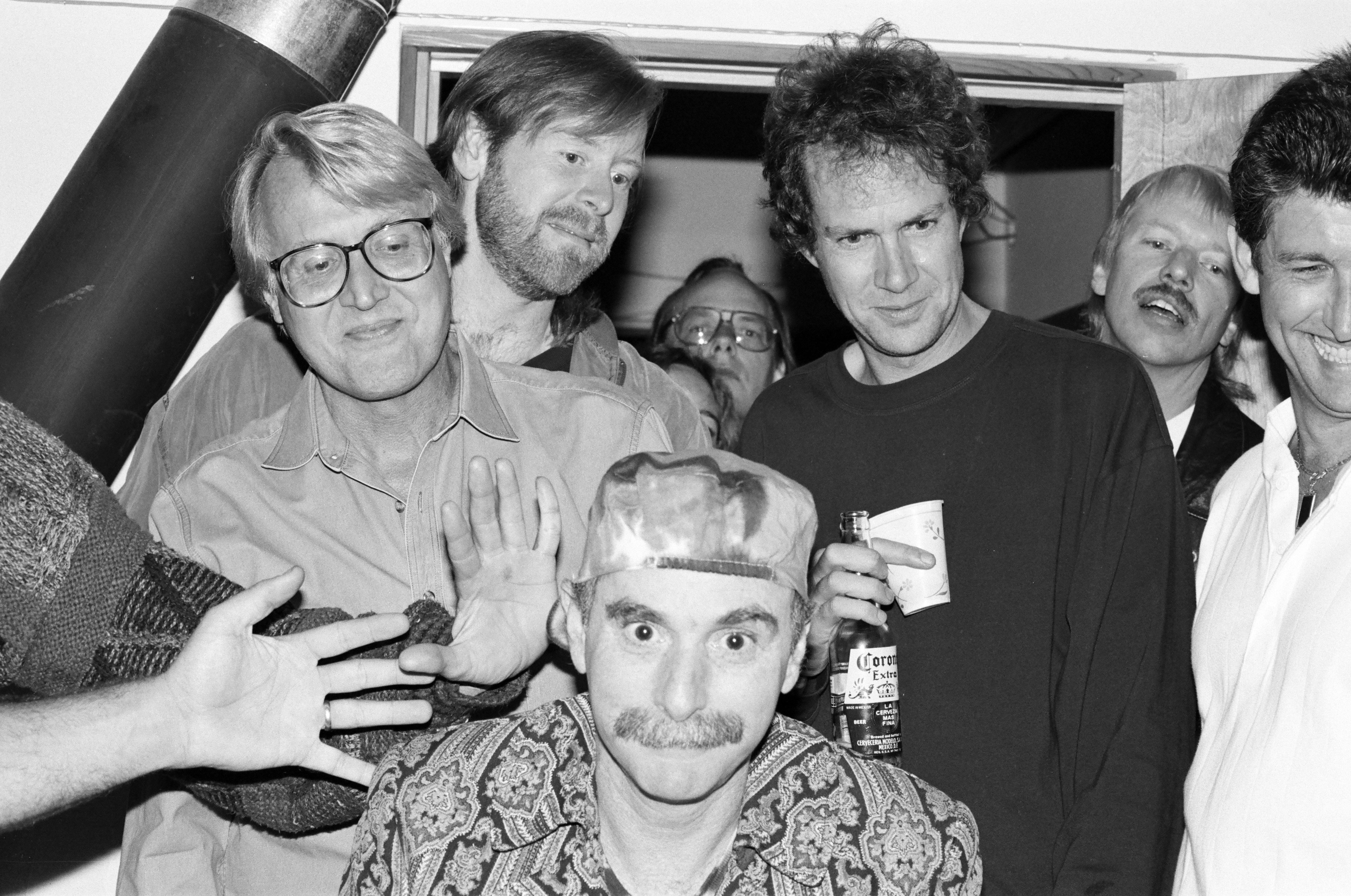
Howard Rheingold, front, and other members of The WELL at a "office party" on September 20, 1991

The WELL's influence online has been significant (see Katie Hafner's 1997 article, "The Epic Saga of the WELL".) Howard Rheingold noted that both Steve Case, one of the founders of AOL, and Craig Newmark, who founded Craigslist, were WELL members before founding their companies. Frequent in-person meetings of WELL members have also been an important facet of The WELL. Monthly WELL Office Parties began in September 1986 and continued for many years thereafter, in the Bay Area and elsewhere. Looking back at the early years, journalist Jon Carroll wrote, "Suddenly there were chili cook-offs and outings to ballgames and brunches and evenings of song... .""

=== The Berkeley Singthing ===
The "Berkeley Singthing," a casual gathering to play and sing popular music, is perhaps the longest running of the in-person gatherings of WELL members. Started in 1991, and taking its name from the Berkeley conference in the WELL where it was originally organized, it is one of the many ways that WELL members connect in the physical world.

=== "AOL for Deadheads" ===
Sociologist Rebecca Adams noted that “Deadheads were electronic pioneers long before it became fashionable to use the Internet or populate the World Wide Web,” with Grateful Dead-related Usenet forums predating the creation of the first WELL conference for Deadheads on March 1, 1986. Musician David Gans, who was hosting an hour of Grateful Dead music on a San Francisco radio station, launched the conference with Bennett Falk and Mary Eisenhart as co-hosts. The creation of the Grateful Dead conference led to a "growth spurt" in the number of WELL members, and in the early years, Deadheads who used its conferences to make plans, trade audiotapes or discuss lyrics were the largest source of revenue for the WELL. Matthew McClure, part of the WELL's original management team, recalled: “The Deadheads came online and seemed to know instinctively how to use the system to create a community around themselves... Suddenly our future looked assured.” By 1997, Eric F. Wybenga's almanac of Grateful Dead resources said the WELL "is to Deadheads what AOL is to the average American online."

=== The Electronic Frontier Foundation ===
The WELL was the forum through which Grateful Dead lyricist John Perry Barlow, John Gilmore, and Mitch Kapor, the founders of the Electronic Frontier Foundation, first met. Barlow wrote that a visit from an FBI agent investigating the theft of some Apple code made him aware how little law enforcement understood the Internet, and even though he was able to persuade the agent he was not involved in the case, he became concerned about the potential for overreach. EFF was formed in 1990 and Mike Godwin, also a WELL member, was hired as the first on-staff attorney. Barlow and Kapor hosted the EFF conference on the WELL, which discussed topics related to free speech and internet regulation. Godwin helped publicize flaws in a notorious early study of pornography on the Internet, which had led to calls for legislative censorship.

=== Craigslist ===
Craigslist founder Craig Newmark joined the WELL shortly after moving to San Francisco in 1993, and was inspired by members’ discussions about internet community, as well as by examples of members offering other members time and professional help without compensation. In 1995, he started sending out an email list of events and job opportunities to friends. Even after this list expanded to a public LISTSERV and incorporated as a for-profit, Newmark said he viewed it as a community trust and emphasized, "The purpose of the Internet is to connect people to make our lives better."

=== Salon ===
Salon.com was founded in the wake of the San Francisco newspaper strike of 1994 by a group of journalists that included WELL members. "The Well [sic] is where a lot of us got our first experience online," Salon co-founder Scott Rosenberg wrote. "In Salon's formative days in 1995 we actually used a private conference [on the WELL] to plan our launch." Salon hired WELL management team member Cliff Figallo in 1998 and WELL conference host Mary Elizabeth Williams to direct its online community, Table Talk. After Salon purchased the WELL in 1999, WELL community manager Gail Ann Williams (no relation) became a Salon employee.

=== Kevin Mitnick hacking case ===
In 1995, Tsutomu Shimomura noticed some of his stolen software had been stored in a WELL account. He worked with WELL management to track and identify hacker Kevin Mitnick as the culprit. This effort was described in Shimomura's book Takedown, which he wrote with John Markoff, and in a Wired article excerpted from the book.

=== Media coverage of the internet and online community ===
The WELL was described in the early 1990s as a "listening post for journalists," with members who were staff writers and editors for the New York Times, Business Week, the San Francisco Chronicle, Time, Rolling Stone, Byte, Harper's, and the Wall Street Journal. This early visibility may have been helped by the early policy of providing free accounts for interested journalists and other select members of the media. Notable journalists who have written about their experiences on the WELL include John Seabrook of the New Yorker, Katie Hafner of the New York Times, Wendy M. Grossman of the Guardian, and Jon Carroll of the San Francisco Chronicle.

== In the news ==
In March 2007, The WELL was noted for refusing membership to Kevin Mitnick, and refunding his membership fee.

The WELL also received numerous awards in the 1980s and 1990s, including a Webby Award for online community in 1998, and an EFF Pioneer Award in 1994.

== Publications about The WELL ==
- Beckerman, Gal, The Quiet Before: On the unexpected origins of radical ideas (2022) Crown ISBN 978-1-5247-5918-6 The chapter, "Interlude: Cyberspace," covers the WELL and lessons learned about virtual community.
- Bruckman, Amy; Curtis, Pavel; Figallo, Cliff; and Laurel, Brenda. “Approaches to Managing Deviant Behavior in Virtual Communities." Conference on Human Factors in Computing Systems, Boston, Massachusetts, April 24–28, 1994. Conference Companion. ResearchGate. Retrieved February 6, 2022.
- Coate, John. "Cyberspace Innkeeping: Building Online Community." Proceedings of Directions and Implications of Advanced Computing (DIAC-92). Berkeley, California, May 2–3, 1992. Collected in Reinventing Technology, Rediscovering Community: Critical Explorations of Computing as a Social Project. Philip E. Agre and Douglas Schuler, eds. Greenwich, Conn.: Ablex Publications, 1997. ISBN 978-1-56750-258-9. An updated and revised version, "Building Online Community," is hosted on his website.
- Driscoll, Kevin, The Modem World: A Prehistory of Social Media. (2022) Yale University. ISBN 978-0-300-24814-2. It contrasts The WELL's paid membership model with the volunteer structure of most BBSes, and notes that The WELL was one of the first dial-up systems directly accessible from the internet.
- Grossman, Wendy M. Net.wars. New York University Press, 1997. ISBN 978-0-8147-3103-1.
- Hafner, Katie, The WELL: A Story of Love, Death and Real Life in the Seminal Online Community (2001) Carroll & Graf Publishers ISBN 0-7867-0846-8 Hafner's book was expanded from a Wired Magazine article.
- Kirk, Andrew. "Appropriating Technology: The Whole Earth Catalog and Counterculture Environmental Politics". In Environmental History, 374–94, 2001.

-- Counterculture Green: The Whole Earth Catalog and American Environmentalism. Lawrence, Kan: University Press of Kansas, 2007.

- Ludlow, Peter, ed. High Noon on the Electronic Frontier: Conceptual Issues in Cyberspace. Foreword by Mike Godwin. MIT Press, 1996. ISBN 978-0-262-12196-5.
- Rheingold, Howard, The Virtual Community. (1994) Perennial ISBN 0-06-097643-8 (Hardcover) – ISBN 0-262-68121-8 (2000 revised paperback edition)
- Rushkoff, Douglas. "Cyberia: Life in the Trenches of Cyberspace.” 2nd ed. Clinamen Press, 2002. ISBN 978-1-903083-24-6.
- Seabrook, John, Deeper: My Two-Year Odyssey in Cyberspace (1997) Simon & Schuster ISBN 0-684-80175-2 (Hardcover) – ISBN 0-684-83873-7 (Paperback)
- Tierney, John. "Stewart Brand: An Early Environmentalist, Embracing New 'Heresies'". The New York Times, February 27, 2007, sec. Environment.
- Turner, Fred, From Counterculture to Cyberculture: Stewart Brand, the Whole Earth Network, and the Rise of Digital Utopianism (2006) University of Chicago Press ISBN 0-226-81741-5

--"Where the Counterculture met the New Economy: The WELL and the Origins of Virtual Community", Technology and Culture, Vol.46, No.3 (July 2005), pp. 485–512.
--"From Counterculture to Cyberculture: How the Whole Earth Catalog Brought Us Virtual Community." (June 21, 2013) Keynote, the Anthropocene Project, Haus der Kulturen der Welt, Berlin. Video (English). HKW on YouTube.

== Policies ==
The WELL distinguished itself from the technology of the time by creating a networked community for everyone. Users were responsible and owned the content posted, a rule created to protect the information from being copyrighted and commoditized.

== See also ==
- CIX
- Hugh Daniel
- Global Business Network
- Tom Mandel
- John Seabrook
- Gail Williams
