= John Coate =

American pioneer in creating online communities

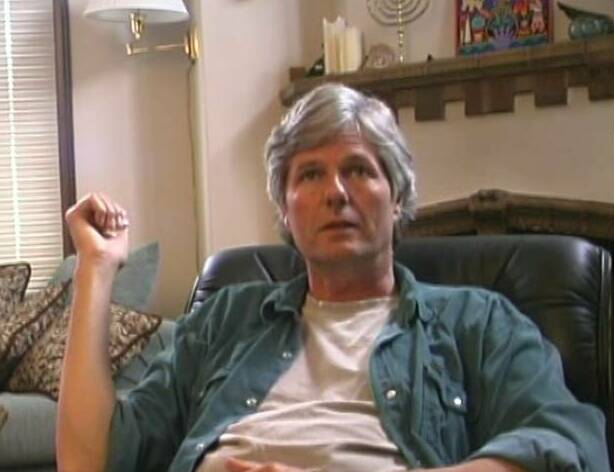
- John Coate, date unknown.
- Born: January 17, 1951 (age 74)
- Occupation: Media executive
- Known for: The WELL, SFGate
- Notable work: "Cyberspace Innkeeping"

John Coate (born January 17, 1951) is an American media executive and advocate for online communities. He was one of the original members of The Farm, an intentional community founded in 1971, and brought lessons learned from building that community to bear in his work online.

He helped create The WELL, one of the earliest online communities in America, and is the author of "Cyberspace Innkeeping,” an essay on best practices for moderators. He later helped create and operate SFGate, an early American News website.

== Career ==
Coate is described in journalist Gal Beckerman's book The Quiet Before as an early bridge between the countercultural movements of the 1960s and online activism. Coate joined The Farm as a teenager, after hearing Stephen Gaskin speak at the Straight Theater on Haight Street in San Francisco, living on a bus with as many as seven other people before the group bought property in Tennessee.

Coate later became the original marketing director and conference manager of The WELL, one of the oldest virtual communities in continuous operation. He was hired by another Farm alumnus, Matthew McClure, in 1986. Even though Coate had never used a computer before, McClure told him his experience with community and as an auto mechanic would help him pick up the necessary skills quickly. Coate and a third Farm alumnus, Cliff Figallo, were called "process queens" by some WELL members for the methodical way they handled disputes among members, but in general were respected as fair moderators, according to Katie Hafner's book about the early years of The WELL. One user told Hafner that with Coate and Figallo in charge, "[t]he WELL treated its dissidents very well."

By the early 1990s, Coate became interested in moving beyond the technology available on The WELL. "For example, at a WELL music conference, you could talk about music, but you couldn't play a clip of it," he told Editor & Publisher. He was also curious about what conversations could be like if they were surrounded by "actual data and reporting." After leaving in 1991, he spent a short stint at Minitel, promoting its online network by demonstrating its terminal at raves. He then became the first general manager of SFGate, originally a joint website for KRON-TV, the San Francisco Chronicle and the San Francisco Examiner, whose launch was sped up by the 1994 San Francisco newspaper strike. He served in that role for seven years. Under his leadership, the site was said to "def[y] more staid newspaper conventions with smart-alecky headlines, spicy chat rooms Coate allows to go R-rated [...] and cyber columnists, including The Betting Fool, a sports gadfly perhaps best known for the time he matched wits on the site with his pothead cousin." It was also known for its "really crazy" design choices, such as changing color schemes from day to night, and for taking an "irreverent and sometimes controversial" tone toward reporting the news. When he stepped down in January 2001, the Chronicle reported SFGate had 55 employees and a million visits a day, "making it one of the earliest and most popular sites for newspapers on the internet."

In 2008, Coate became general manager of public radio station KZYX in Mendocino County. He was credited with nearly eliminating that station's debt, but was also one of the targets of a 2014 FCC complaint by a board member who was unhappy with station hiring and programming decisions. The Federal Communications Commission renewed the station's license on September 15, 2015, after reviewing the complaint.

From 2016-2021 Coate was an advisor to a European consulting group, Edgeryders, a think tank and "open consulting" company.

== Impact ==
Coate summed up what he learned at The WELL in an essay, "Cyberspace Innkeeping: Building Online Community," that has been cited in various discussions of how to grow and manage audience participation online. In this essay, Coate described logging on as using "new tools for an ancient activity" and discussed how members had used the WELL to make business connections, seek medical advice, and organize pot-luck parties. For the term "electronic village" to apply, he wrote, "this blending of business and pleasure must be present. Because that's what a village is: a place where you go down to the butcher or the blacksmith and transact your business, and at night meet those same neighbors down at the local tavern or the Friday night dance." Dennis M. Weiss, professor of philosophy at York College of Pennsylvania, cited Coate's essay in arguing that "small town" was one of the central metaphors for online communities. Susan Greenberg, a lecturer at Roehampton University, quoted Coate in discussing how online discourse blends elements of both oral and written communication. Social media consultant Vanessa DiMauro described hearing Coate's keynote as one of the highlights of the VIRCOMM Summit of 2013, and said his essay "still serves as an up-to-the-minute guide to online community best practices."

In a review of Beckerman's book, The Economist magazine called Coate the "godfather of social media."
