= Cliff Figallo =

American social media pioneer (1949–2022)

- Born: January 12, 1949; Washington, District of Columbia
- Died: September 11, 2022 (aged 73); Mill Valley, California
- Occupations: Designer and manager of social media platforms
- Known for: The WELL, Salon.com
- Notable work: Hosting Web Communities (1998)

Cliff Figallo (January 12, 1949 – September 11, 2022) was an American planner, designer and manager of social media platforms. He was a member of The Farm, an intentional community founded in 1971, and helped create The WELL, one of the earliest online communities in America, the Table Talk online discussion forum for Salon.com and the Electronic Frontier Foundation.

He wrote two books and a number of articles on managing online communities and maximizing free speech online. "The Figallo effect" was used by Jonathan Bishop of Swansea University to describe organic growth in an online community due to trust among non-anonymous members.

== Career ==
Cliff Figallo lived on The Farm for 12 years. He described community leader Stephen Gaskin's vision as an experiment in "extending the visions of the psychedelic world into the straight everyday world," and said members were encouraged to challenge each other and to "get into" each other's "thing" in order to form a "transcendent" collective. Reminiscing about The Farm in The Whole Earth Review, Figallo recalled, "We were very much into Truth, and at times we wielded it on others like a bludgeon." By the early 1980s, many of the original members of the collective were moving onto other ventures.

Figallo told Jon Lebkowsky he was recruited in 1983 by Matthew McClure, who had also lived on The Farm, to help put out the Whole Earth Catalog. That job developed two years later into building The WELL, which was a UNIX-based discussion forum and online community, a large and sophisticated Bulletin board system. Figallo told Lebkowsky, "Sitting in the room next to him, I'd ask Matthew how he regarded The WELL as compared to the Farm. [...] It was clear to me that he was avoiding as much similarity with our old absolute guru [Gaskin] as possible. Yes, we could bring some wisdom about relationships and fair sharing of limited resources. Yes, we could apply some lessons learned about dealing with people who were 'into the juice' – being greedy about attracting attention. And yes, we could appeal to whatever value people put into becoming part of a new community."

Figallo and a third Farm alumnus, John Coate, were responsible for encouraging discussion and moderating disputes between members of the online community. Fred Turner describes their role as "scientists" whose job "was to set the boundary conditions for the system and then to step back and observe its operation." They were called "process queens" by some WELL members for their methodical approach, but in general were respected as fair moderators, according to Katie Hafner's book about the early years of The WELL. One user told Hafner that with Coate and Figallo in charge, "[t]he WELL treated its dissidents very well."

Figallo described his philosophy for moderating the WELL's online discussions as "based on democratic principles and First Amendment rights to free speech and assembly", and he argued that self-contained, regional online "small towns" would offer the best alternative to the "corporate controlled electronic consumer shopping mall" model for the internet. His concerns about the potential for censorship, "official overreaction [...] based on ignorance and fear of the power and capabilities of computers" led to his joining the Electronic Frontier Foundation as the director of its Cambridge office, where EFF's community-building efforts were centered. According to Rheingold, EFF "began its public outreach via a conference on the WELL," engaging in a dialogue there with "cryptographers, criminologists, hackers, crackers and attorneys about what kind of law enforcement that is proper and improper in cyberspace."

During Figallo's tenure at the WELL, only one member was thrown off for consistently abusive and disruptive behavior. Figallo believed "Controversy is good for business, and it's good for freedom in general." This attitude eventually contributed to his departure from the WELL in 1992. Figallo's resignation letter to the Board cited changes in company approach: "I am too much identified with the permissive and accommodating attitude that has been part of The Well's growth to preside over a more restrictive régime." He helped develop AOL's first web chat interface, then moved to Salon.com to manage its Table Talk online community. In an interview connected with the 1998 release of his book Hosting Web Communities, Figallo observed, "I see the same sorts of dynamics of people identifying who they agree with, who they don't agree with, who they like, who they don't like, and then sort of freezing into those conflicts. Those conflicts become the tension within the community that is always there. [...] If you're managing a community where you allow people to be themselves, explore and be creative, there are a lot of things that you really cannot control."

After leaving Salon, Figallo worked as a consultant. In 2002, he helped Web Lab recruit moderators for the online component of Listening to the City, a project to collect community input on plans for rebuilding the World Trade Center site.

== Impact ==
In a 2012 chapter contrasting different models of "sysop privilege" in controlling online communities, Jonathan Bishop of Swansea University used "the Figallo effect" to describe community growth that develops "organically with trust and comradeship" among non-anonymous members, such as on the WELL. He wrote that in "removing the veil of anonymity" from its users to discourage antisocial behavior, "the sysops of World of Warcraft are trying to give their community the Figallo effect [...]."

Upon Figallo's death, Whole Earth founder Stewart Brand tweeted "Cliff Figallo shepherded the WELL through its most influential years in the 1980s."

== Personal life ==
Figallo was married to Anita Figallo (Strenge) with whom he fathered four sons and helped take care of her two daughters. He later divorced Anita and married Nancy Rhine who had three daughters.

== Bibliography ==
- Building the Knowledge Management Network. With Nancy Rhine. (2002) John Wiley & Sons. ISBN 978-0-471-21549-3. From the publisher's summary: "Written by two of the foremost experts in online communities, this book covers a set of best practices, tools, and techniques for using conversation and online interaction to provide affordable and effective knowledge-based benefits and solutions."
- Hosting Web Communities: Building Relationships, Increasing Customer Loyalty, and Maintaining a Competitive Edge. (1998) Wiley. ISBN 978-0-471-28293-8. From the publisher's summary: "A detailed, easy-to-follow recipe for planning, developing, and maintaining a successful Web community."
- "Trust, Identity, Reputation and Learning in Organizations." Creating a Learning Culture: Strategy, Technology and Practice, eds. Marcia L. Conner and James G. Clawson. (2004) Cambridge University Press. ISBN 978-0-521-53717-9.
- "The 'Listening to the City' Online Dialogues Experience: The Impact of a Full Value Contract." With Steven N. Pyser. (Spring 2004) Conflict Resolution Quarterly. Vol. 21, Issue 3: 381–393. Via Wiley.
- "Approaches to Managing Deviant Behavior in Virtual Communities." Panel with Amy Bruckman, Pavel Curtis, and Brenda Laurel. Conference on Human Factors in Computing Systems, Boston, Massachusetts, April 24–28, 1994. Conference Companion. Via ResearchGate. (This topic was addressed again at CHI conferences in 2006 and 2018.)
- "The Well: Small Town on the Information Highway." Whole Earth Review, 1 September 1993. Part of the Internet Archive's Whole Earth Collection.
