= Gail Williams =

American computer scientist

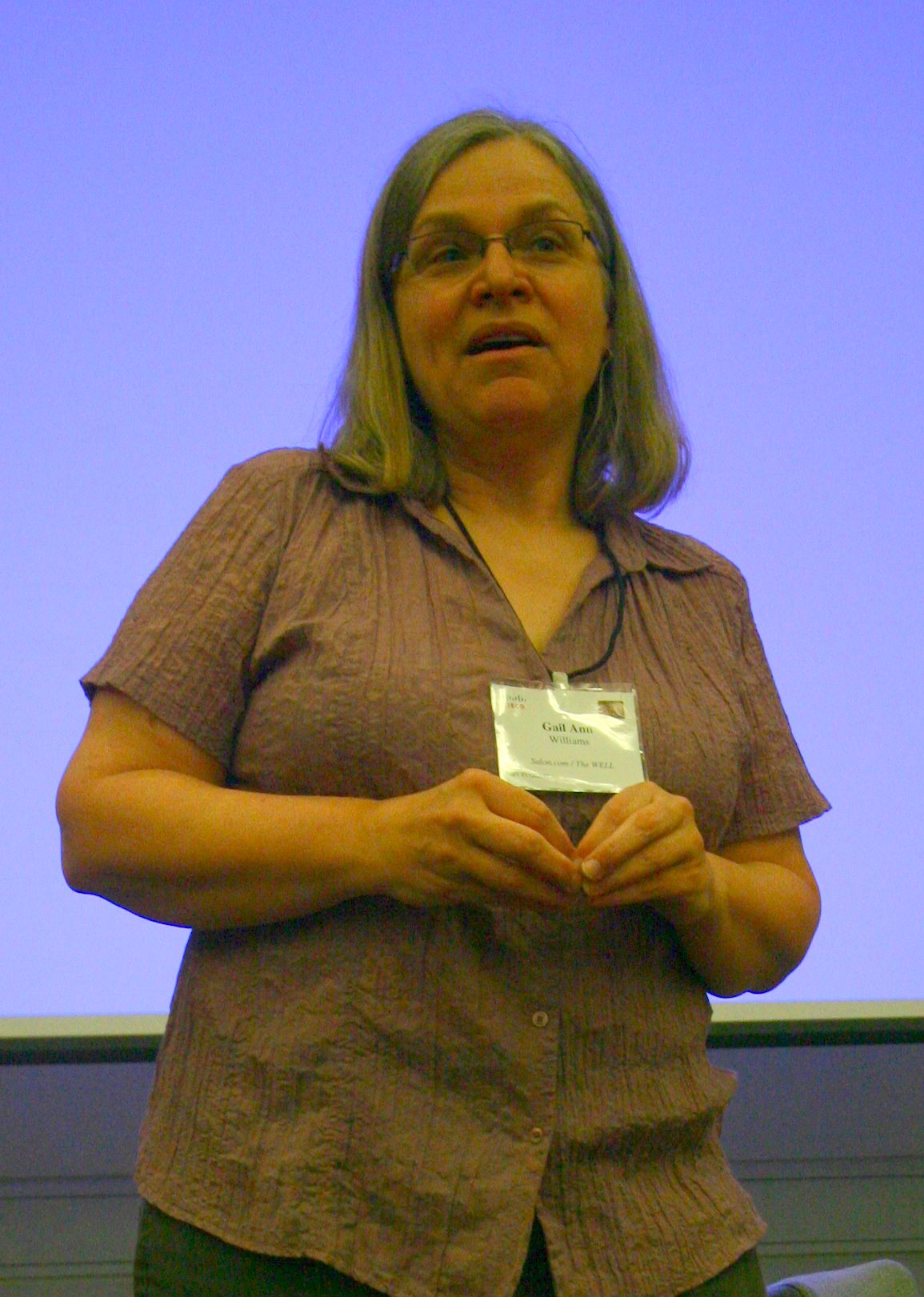
- Williams in 2008
- Born: Berkeley, California, United States
- Education: University of California, Berkeley
- Occupations: Writer, actor, theater manager, online community manager
- Years active: 1978–2016
- Spouse: Steven Shapiro (m. 2010)
- Website: gailwilliams.com

Gail Ann Williams (born in Berkeley, California) was the director of The WELL from 1998 to 2016. She graduated from the University of California, Berkeley in the 1970s and got involved in political theater as both a creative and management member of the Plutonium Players troupe. She was a principal in their long-touring satirical show spoofing anti-feminist politics, Ladies Against Women, throughout the years of the Ronald Reagan presidency. The show was inspired in part by the anti-feminist campaigns of Phyllis Schlafly, who was parodied by the troupe as Phyllis LeShaft.

In the same period the troupe created the "Reagan for Shah Campaign," featuring numerous fictional constituent organizations of which Ladies Against Women was the most popular. The show toured the East and West Coasts in 1980 and performed outside the Republican Convention in Dallas in 1984. Both Ladies Against Women and Reagan for Shah were cited by Andrew Boyd as helping to inspire his Billionaires for Bush theatrical project.

In December 1991, she joined the management team of the prototypic online community, The WELL, in the role of community manager. In 1998 she took the post of Executive Director. When The WELL was acquired by Salon.com in 1999, Williams stayed on. Currently she serves as Salon's Director of Communities, overseeing The WELL and Salon's Table Talk community.

She is a member of the International Academy of Digital Arts and Sciences. In 2000 Williams was named as one of the Top 25 Women of the Web.
