= Tom Mandel (futurist) =

- Born: 1946; Chicago, Illinois
- Died: April 6, 1995 (aged 48–49)
- Education: University of Hawaii
- Occupation: futurologist

Tom Mandel (1946 – April 6, 1995) was an American futurologist. He was born in Chicago, Illinois. He dropped out of college twice and served in the United States Marine Corps in the Vietnam War for nine months in 1969. In 1972, he was the first graduate of the "Futures program" at the University of Hawaii. He then did some graduate work in cybernetics at San Jose State University and was hired as a futurologist by SRI International (formerly the Stanford Research Institute) in Menlo Park, California, in 1975.

Mandel's consulting practice focused on social trend analysis and forecasting for a wide range of consumer products and technology companies, and he published several scenarios reports in collaboration with the Values and Lifestyles (VALS) program at SRI and as a senior consultant in SRI's Business Intelligence Center.

In addition to his work at SRI, Mandel was an editor of Time Online and "one of the most prolific citizens of the on-line community known as the Well," where he was considered "a central figure." His experiences in that community became the basis of a magazine article and a book by Katie Hafner.

Mandel was "one of the first (if not the first) to share on-line, with a wide audience, his own experience of dying." On March 25, 1995, he posted on The Well that he was dying of lung cancer. He died eleven days later on April 6, 1995, at Stanford University Hospital, listening to Beethoven's Ninth Symphony with his wife Nana. He was 49.
