= Bruce R. Katz =

American entrepreneur (1947–2022)

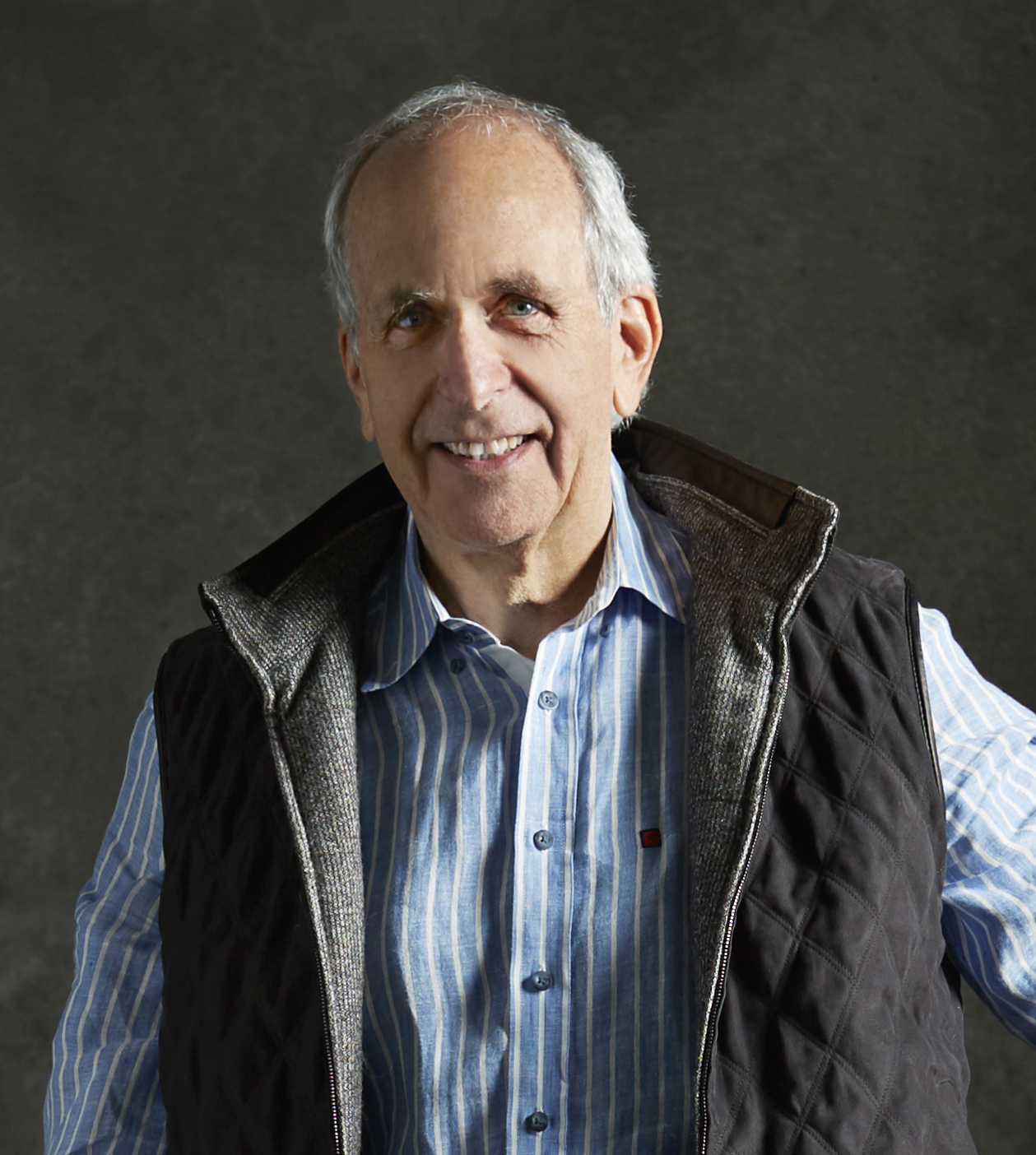
- Born: Bruce Richard Katz; February 17, 1947; Newton, Massachusetts, U.S.
- Died: June 26, 2022 (aged 75); Greenbrae, California, U.S.
- Education: Cornell University
- Occupations: Co-founder, Chairman of Samuel Hubbard Shoe Company; Chairman, Katz Family Foundation
- Known for: Pioneer of the lightweight casual shoe

Bruce Richard Katz (February 17, 1947 – June 26, 2022) was an American entrepreneur who co-founded The Rockport Shoe Company in 1971 and served as its CEO until its sale to Reebok International in 1986. He was the founder and CEO of The Samuel Hubbard Shoe Company based in Mill Valley, California.

== Early life ==
Bruce R. Katz was born into a Jewish Lithuanian family in 1947. He was a third-generation designer and shoe maker, grandson of Samuel J. Katz who founded The Hubbard Shoe Company in 1930. As the son of a U.S. Navy officer who served at the radiation laboratories at the Massachusetts Institute of Technology during World War II, Katz was fascinated with science and technology as a boy in Rochester, New Hampshire, and Newton, Massachusetts. He built his first computer in 1960 when he was thirteen years old. Katz went on to study Engineering Physics at Cornell University.

== The Rockport Shoe Company ==
The Katz family shoe manufacturing operations in Rochester ceased in 1970, a victim, along with most New England shoe factories of the time, of the growing flood of cheaper foreign shoes sweeping the markets. Katz's father, Saul L. Katz, then formed the Highland Import Company and began importing shoes from Brazil for a variety of branded American shoe companies. After college and extensive travel around the United States, the younger Katz spent several years preparing to pursue his dream of sailing around the world. He set up shop in Ithaca, New York, and began building a 65-foot ketch. In order to help his father and to earn money to finish building the boat, the twenty-three-year-old began traveling from town to town selling off closeouts from his father's import business.

After a year, father and son decided to develop their own unique brand of shoes engineered for comfort, which they called Rockport, and their business began to grow. Seven years later, after Nike introduced the first lightweight running shoes, Katz moved to develop the first lightweight casual shoe using similar materials and with light orthotics that had never before been offered in conventional leather shoes. RocSports, as they were called, were a huge success and the company's annual sales reached nearly US$100 million by 1986. One reason for the success was the public awareness campaign launched by Rockport in 1983 about the aerobic benefits of what became known as Fitness Walking. Rockport sponsored walking clubs, events, films, medical research, and books about walking. In 2013 Footwear Plus inducted the Rockport “ProWalker” into its Style Hall of Fame, noting that the shoe was introduced before “walking shoes” had even been established as a footwear category.

== The WELL ==
Following the sale of Rockport to Reebok International, Bruce Katz moved to the San Francisco Bay Area in 1987, where he involved himself with early online communities, which were then merely individual "Bulletin Boards" into which users would dial on phone lines through modems. Founded by Stewart Brand and Larry Brilliant in 1985, The WELL (Whole Earth 'Lectronic Link) had over 5,000 members by 1990. They gathered and conversed electronically around 270 different topic areas in what became known as a "virtual community". Katz acquired The WELL in 1994, and, when the Internet began to emerge from the early ARPANET, he moved to connect it to the early network, enabling users to log in from anywhere and access anything on the Net, not just The WELL's discussion lists and servers. According to Smart Computing Encyclopedia, The WELL was “one of the first major, worldwide online communities available on the Internet.” Around the same time, Katz also created a new company called Whole Earth Networks, one of the largest regional Internet service providers, that provided dial-up Internet access with a suite of tools, including e-mail and the new Mosaic web browser.

In 1995 The WELL became the first online service to offer its members direct self-publishing on the web. These pages, which allowed each member to present materials and links that interested them as well as their own discussion areas, were the forerunner of what became known as blogs.

In 1999 The WELL was sold to Salon.

== Well Engaged ==
Katz's experience with The WELL convinced him of the need for web sites to support conversations between users. As a consequence, he created Well Engaged, a service bureau providing discussion-group capability within a web browser and on web pages, and he served as its CEO until the company was spun off and merged to become Prospero Technologies. Well Engaged has served Washingtonpost.com, Fox Entertainment, Ziff-Davis Media, E-Trade, Tribune Interactive, About.com, Business Week, Major League Baseball, and other leading Internet news and commerce sites.

== Samuel Hubbard Shoe Company ==
In 2012, 26 years after Katz exited the shoe industry, he contemplated a return to the business. Katz's interest led him to a trade show in Las Vegas, where he encountered Werner Wyrsch, a former product development executive at Rockport. The two shared their disappointment with the direction of the shoe business, prompting Katz to say, “Let’s show them how to make shoes again.”

As a result, in 2013 Katz founded the Samuel Hubbard Shoe Company in Mill Valley, CA, with a team including Wyrsch. The company name was an homage to Katz's grandfather, Samuel Katz, and Samuel's shoe company, which he had called Hubbard Shoe. To Katz, the state of the shoe industry offered limitless opportunity: "I saw that the men’s business had been decimated by ... the overwhelming success of Nike and others. There was a whole generation that had never worn shoes."

His strategy was to merge comfort with classic and stylish shoe design—making a range of lifestyle models for casual, business and outdoor wear. Katz delivered comfort by insisting on using high-quality materials, offering a wide range of sizes and widths, and focusing on details. Samuel Hubbard shoes are made in Portugal.

== Philanthropy and board service ==
Katz joined with his friends Mel and Patricia Ziegler and Bill Rosenzweig to help create The Republic of Tea in 1992. He supplied the capital for the business and served on the board until 1994, when the company was sold to New Age Beverages.

Katz created the Springhouse Foundation in 1986, which later became the Katz Family Foundation. It supports a variety of environmental and educational organizations. In 1994 the Foundation provided early seed capital for the creation of Business for Social Responsibility, a global nonprofit organization that works with its network of more than 250 member companies to build a just and sustainable world.

In addition to serving on the boards of directors of The WELL, Whole Earth Networks, Well Engaged, and The Republic of Tea, Bruce Katz was a director of E-Greetings Network, Zing, GetMedia, Paradise Bay Salmon Farms, Esprit de Corps, and the Northern California Film Institute.

== Later life and death ==
Katz died on June 26, 2022, at a hospital in Greenbrae, California, of injuries after a fall at his Mill Valley home.
