= Rockport (company) =

American shoe brand

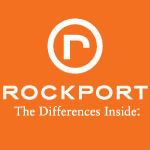

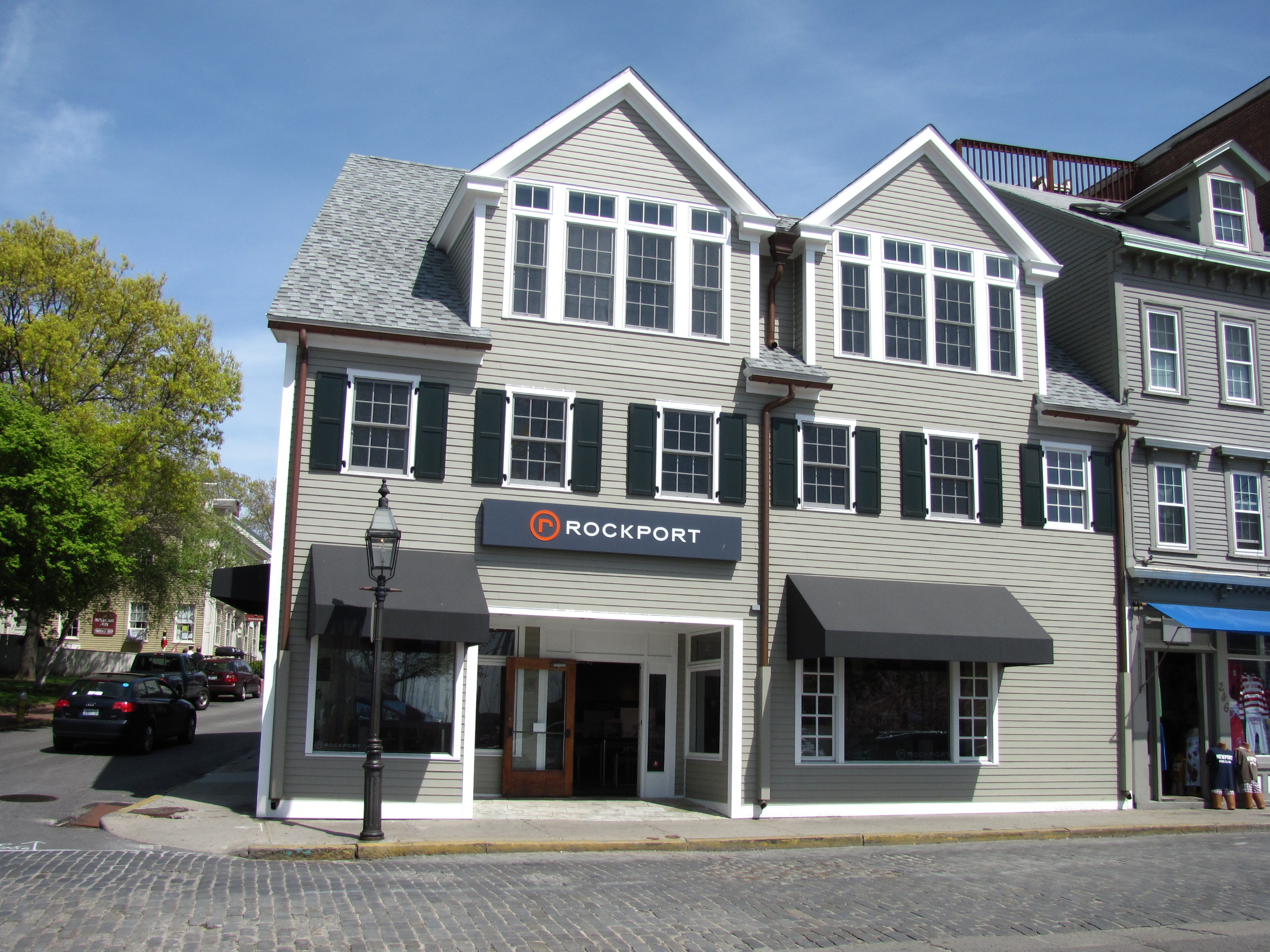
- A Rockport store in Newport, Rhode Island
- Founder: Saul and Bruce Katz
- Website: rockport.com

The Rockport Group is an American shoe brand owned by Authentic Brands Group. Associated brands include Aravon, Dunham and Rockport, and the Rockport Cobb Hill Collection.

Founded in Marlborough, Massachusetts, in 1971 by Saul L. Katz and his son, Bruce R. Katz, the company marketed walking as a healthy alternative to running. In 2023 the Rockport Group was acquired by Authentic Brands Group.

== History ==
In 1930, Samuel Katz founded the Hubbard Shoe Company, which had its first factory in Rochester, New Hampshire; eight years later the company employed 700. In 1945, Saul Katz took control of Hubbard from his father. In the 1960s, U.S. shoe manufacturing increasingly moved to countries with lower labor costs, making it difficult for U.S. plants to stay competitive in the face of less expensive imports. Saul Katz urged Congress to aid the American shoe industry and in 1977 the Carter administration imposed quotas on shoe imports, but the controls arrived too late for Hubbard, which went out of business in 1970.

Saul Katz continued to run a surviving subsidiary spun off from Hubbard, called Highland Import. It operated out of offices in the old Diamond Shoe Company in Marlborough, Massachusetts, and imported shoes from Brazil. Highland Import worked with American branded shoe companies to develop special products. One was a hand sewn heavy leather moccasin modeled after a shoe developed by Walter Dyer in Rockport, Massachusetts. When Saul Katz went to the tannery in Brazil he named the leather Rockport.

The 3,000 pairs of moccasins brought into Marlborough arrived too late for Highland’s customer and so the shoes remained in the warehouse for some months. Bruce Katz then began working with his father and travelled the East Coast from Boston to Washington, D.C., selling these shoes in plain white boxes to small leather shops and shoe boutiques in many small towns. The shoes carried no name until Katz learned that others were copying the shoes and calling them "Rockport type" shoes. He subsequently returned to Marlborough and started branding the shoes as "Rockport".

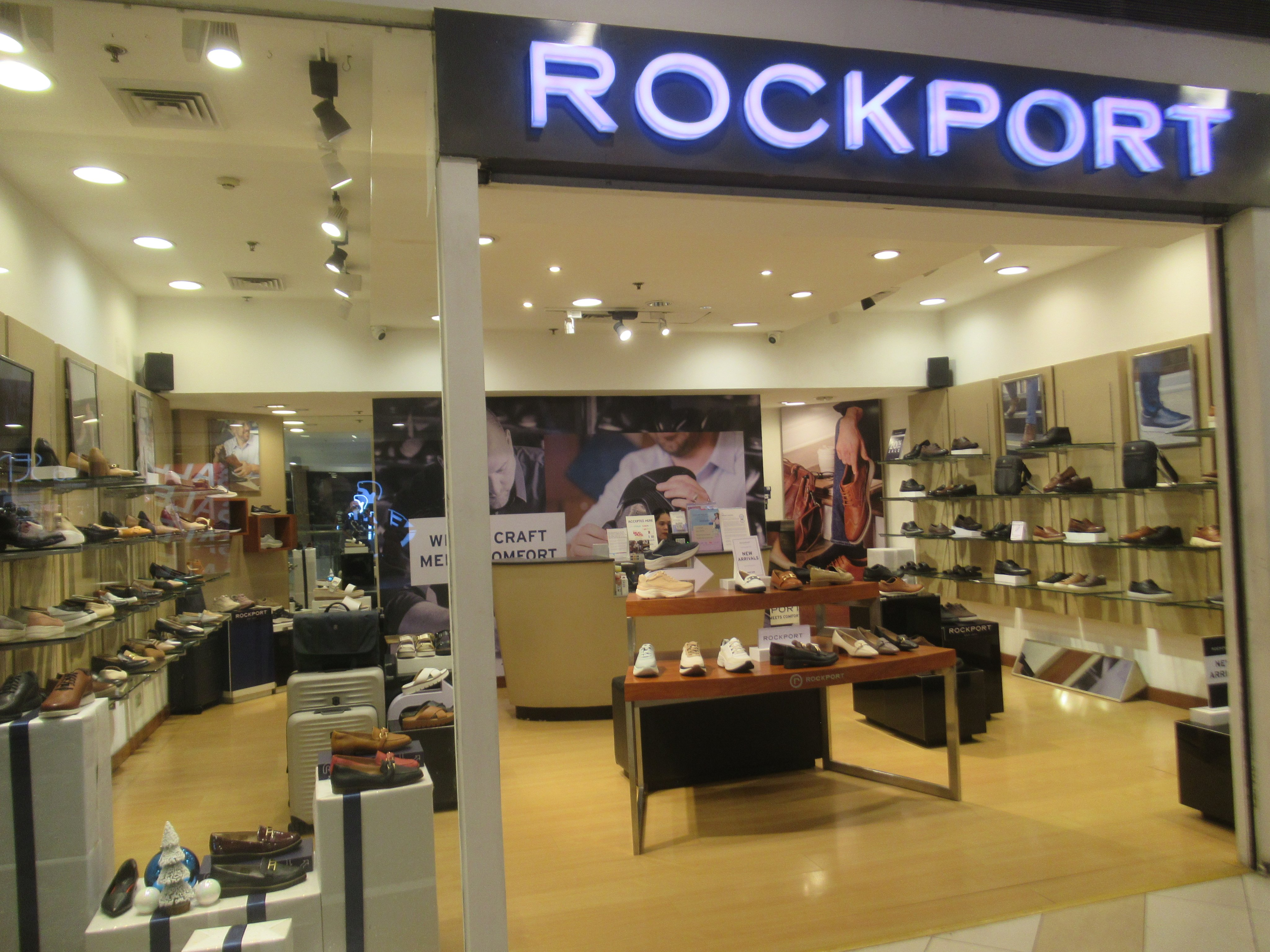
Rockport Philippines

In 1971, Saul Katz and his son, Bruce, formed The Rockport Company from Highland Import. The company was started with $15,000 and grew by staying profitable each year. In 1986, shortly before the company was sold, Rockport's sales were reaching nearly $100 million a year, having turned a profit every year since it was founded.

In 1986, Rockport was preparing to go public when the family decided instead to sell the company to British athletic footwear giant Reebok. Bruce Katz remained as president for one year before turning over the management to a new Reebok CEO. Saul Katz stayed on as part of the management team until retiring in his 70s. Later Reebok was sold to German company Adidas.

On August 3, 2015, Berkshire Partners and New Balance Holding, Inc. completed the acquisition of The Rockport Company from the Adidas Group, and combined Rockport with Drydock Footwear, an affiliate of New Balance, to form a new company called The Rockport Group. Drydock brought with it the Aravon, Cobb Hill, and Dunham brands to the new firm. Rockport moved its headquarters from Canton to Newton, Massachusetts.

In December 2017, sources reported that Crescent Capital Group, a major creditor of The Rockport Group, acquired ownership of Rockport from Berkshire Partners. On May 14, 2018, Rockport filed for Chapter 11 bankruptcy protection, citing a "costly and time-consuming separation" from their former owner, Adidas AG. Charlesbank Capital Partners purchased the company out of bankruptcy in July 2018; on July 23, the company's 60 brick-and-mortar retail locations were closed.

On June 14, 2023, Rockport filed for Chapter 11 bankruptcy again. In August, the brand was acquired by Authentic Brands Group.

== Products ==
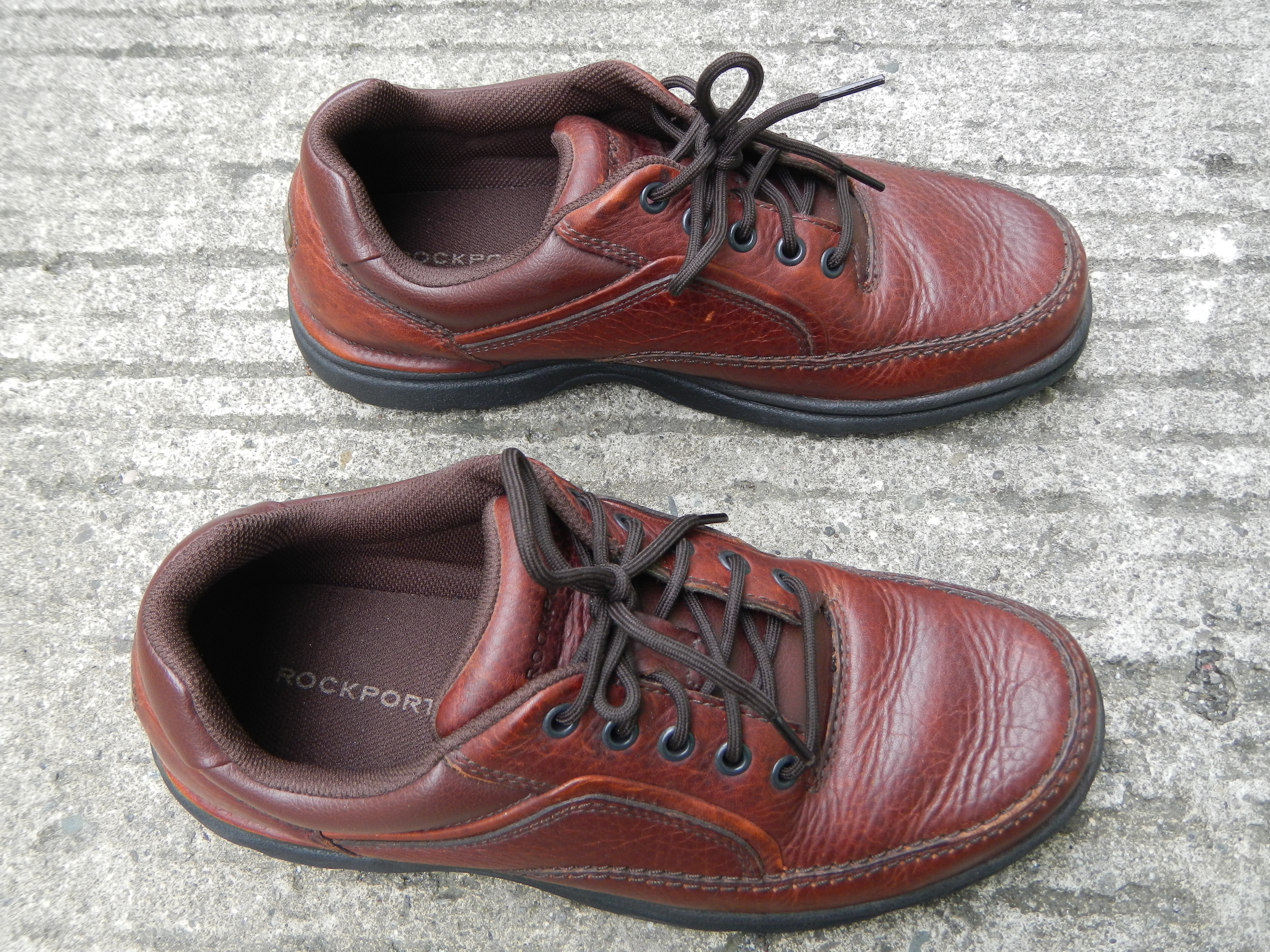
The Rockport "World Tour" model, the company's signature walking shoe from the late 1990s until 2015.

Rockport is credited with popularizing walking as a healthy alternative to running. It invested heavily in design and spent lavishly on marketing to create a strong brand name and carve out a market niche. Rockport also invested in research into the biomechanics of walking to design its shoes.

Rockport's first product was the Country Walker, introduced in 1973. On the basis of the company’s subsequent RocSport shoe and those that followed, Bruce Katz is credited by the shoe industry monthly Footwear Plus with creating the "modern-day lightweight and technology-infused comfort shoe concept."

Rockport shoes of this period were designed as alternatives to athletic shoes, which were gaining in popularity as all-purpose footwear. Rockport focused on designing shoes that more closely resembled traditional styles, but sought to incorporate the lightness and comfort of running shoes. This development effort made the RocSport "perhaps the first real 'high technology shoe'", according to James A. Phills, Jr., who teaches at the Stanford Graduate School of Business and Apple University, Apple Inc.'s in-house business management school.

In 1984, Rockport sponsored an 11,600-mile walk across the country and traversing every state to promote walking as a popular form of exercise. Company-sponsored walkers participating in “Walk for the Health of It” included Robert Sweetgall, whose books helped popularize walking for exercise. Sweetgall and the other walkers wore Rockport shoes and their trek was documented in a film, Walk America! Largely as a result of the company’s promotional activities, Rockport shoes became closely associated with walking.
