= Helith =

Helith Network
- Helith Logo
- Formation: 1999
- Purpose: Hacker think tank, black hat, gray hat, white hat
- Location: Global
- Origin: Germany
- Founders: Rembrandt; ConCode
- Affiliations: milw0rm
- Website: Main Site

Helith Network (or just "Helith") is a hacker collective active since 1999 and is a globally spread community. It is suspected that Helith is affiliated to specialists in the field of malware and network security.

== Name ==
The origin of the name came from the Proto-West Germanic language, in which the word Helith means "Heroes." It was chosen because the group was founded in Germany, but it also reflects the group's belief that nobody cares for those who are poor or those who do not had the same chances as studied hackers. It was also chosen to point out that the members just do what they want to do even if it conflicts with laws or civil restrictions like beliefs or ethics.

Some of the founding members of Helith shared a belief and talked during a Chaos Communication Congress Congress in 1998–1999 in Germany at an improved round table conference about what needs to get done to reach this goal. At the conference Rembrandt was chosen to be the public link for Helith and thus making him the poster child and victim for federal forces. It is not known who is member of "Helith" nor how many members do exist or what they do in detail because very few information get public and Rembrandt itself is a very problematic character like Theo de Raadt.

== History ==
Helith was founded in 1998–1999 in the Berlin area as a location for its members to share information without judging anybody about how they make their living or for whom they work. Their computer hardware and work on various projects like John the Ripper (partly SSE2 code, porting to OpenBSD), metasploit, medusa, hydra or nmap. In time, the members of "Helith" released several security advisories affecting OpenBSD, PF firewall, OpenSSH, NetBSD and vendors like Netgear or Nortel. On July 30, 2007, Washington Post reporter Brian Krebs wrote an article partly about "Helith" cracking the Deutsche Bank internal network.

The global links of Helith reach least from Germany where it was founded, to Russia, Romania, Columbia, several African countries and the USA.

== Members ==
Helith Network membership varied but included at various times:

- benkei,
- ConCode,
- Cyneox,
- Rembrandt,
- Rott_En,
- noptrix,
- Skyout,
- Zarathu

A lot other members might be active but are not disclosed. The list was created during research with Google and visiting the Helith-Website.
