= LC5 =

LC5 may refer to:

- Launch Complex 5 (disambiguation), two American launch pads
- Local Council 5, one of five Local Council levels in Uganda
- LC5, was a free replacement tool similar to L0phtcrack. No longer being developed.
- Could stand for 5 gallons of liquid chlorine (liquid chlorine 5gal)
