= Window Snyder =

Computer security expert (born 1975)

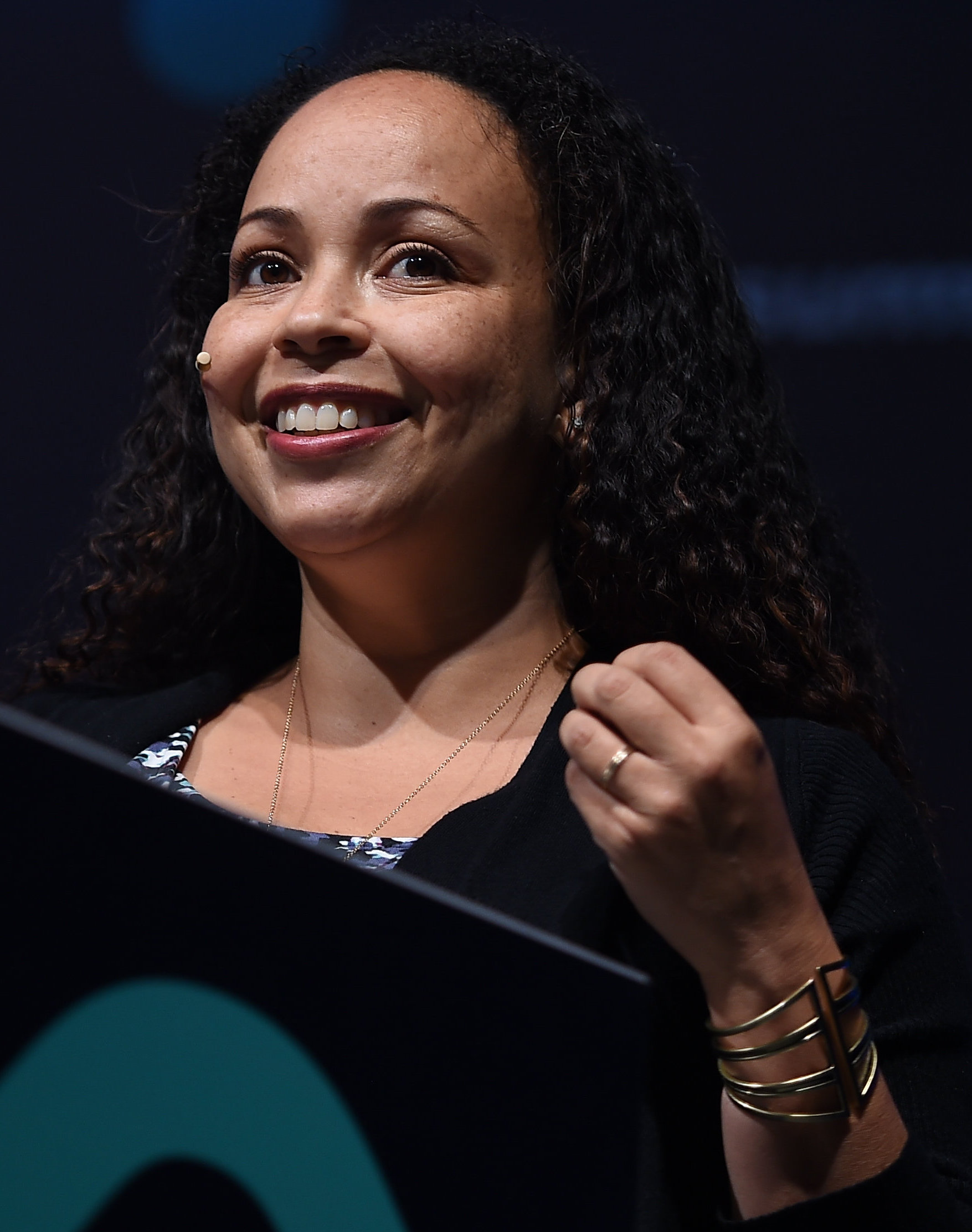
- Born: Mwende Window Snyder; 1975 (age 50–51); Honolulu, Hawaii
- Occupation: Software security officer

Mwende Window Snyder (born 1975), better known as Window Snyder, is an American computer security expert. She has been a top security officer at Square, Inc., Apple, Fastly, Intel and Mozilla Corporation. She was also a senior security strategist at Microsoft. She is co-author of Threat Modeling, a standard manual on application security.

== Biography ==
Snyder was born in New Jersey, of an American father and a Kenyan-born mother, Wayua Muasa. She goes by her middle name Window; her first name is used only by family members. She attended Boston College, after graduating from Choate Rosemary Hall in 1993 and has served on their board. While earning her undergraduate degree in computer science, she became interested in cryptography and crypto-analysis and began actively working on the topic of cybersecurity with the Boston hacker community in the 1990s, building her own tools and getting familiar with multi-user systems. She went by the nickname Rosie the Riveter in the hacker scene.

She then pursued this career path as one of the first computer scientists to specialize in cybersecurity, and to proactively try to bridge the gap between corporations and the security researchers often termed 'hackers.' She joined @stake as the 10th employee, and rose to director of security architecture, until she left the company in 2002. Subsequently, she worked as a senior security strategist at Microsoft in the Security Engineering and Communications group. During this time, she was a contributor to the Security Design Lifecycle (SDL) and co-developed a new methodology for threat modeling software, as well as acting as security lead and signoff on Microsoft Windows XP Service Pack 2 and Windows Server 2003. She also created the Blue Hat Microsoft Hacker Conference, an event bringing together engineers at Microsoft and hackers for a dialogue about the security of Microsoft's software. After leaving Microsoft in 2005, she worked as a principal, founder, and CTO at Matasano Security, a security services and product company later acquired by NCC Group. She joined Mozilla in September 2006.

On December 10, 2008, Snyder said that she would be leaving Mozilla Corporation at the end of the year. On March 1, 2010, Snyder began work at Apple Inc. as product manager responsible for the privacy and security of all Apple products.

In 2015, Snyder became chief security officer at content distribution network Fastly.

Intel's Software and Services Group senior vice president and general manager, Doug Fisher, announced in July 2018 that Snyder would become the company's Platforms Security Division's chief security officer, vice president and general manager. She has since left Intel and in May 2019 joined Square, Inc.

On April 22, 2021, Snyder announced she had started a new company, Thistle Technologies, which describes itself as providing a "secure foundation for devices."

== Works ==
- Swiderski, Frank; Snyder, Window (2004), Threat Modeling; Microsoft professional, Microsoft Press, ISBN 0-7356-1991-3

== Public appearances ==
Window Snyder has been appearing publicly to speak about challenges in computer security at several conferences and hackathons. In May 2017 Snyder spoke at Next Generation Threats, held by Techworld, IDG in Stockholm, Sweden. Earlier in April Snyder was a keynote speaker at HITBSecConf, held by Hack in the Box in Amsterdam. Later in November Snyder spoke at O'Reilly Security Conference. In April 2018 she spoke at RSA Conference, and in August 2018 Snyder was a keynote speaker at the Open Source Summit held by the Linux Foundation.

She has talked about career paths of women in cybersecurity, as for example in a keynote at the Women in Tech Symposium on March 6, 2020, on the UC Berkeley campus.
