= Kriegsman =

Kriegsman is a surname. Notable people with the surname include:

- Alan M. Kriegsman (1928–2012), American dance critic
- James J. Kriegsmann (1909–1994), celebrity and theatrical photographer
- Mark Kriegsman (born 1966), American entrepreneur
