= Prototype This! =

- Genre: Documentary; Science; Technology
- Written by: David Friedman; Rob Miller; Richard Stomps
- Directed by: John Tessier; Anthony Toy
- Starring: Andrew "Zoz" Brooks; Mike North; Terry Sandin; Joe Grand; John Guidry
- Composer: Colin Bayley
- Country of origin: United States
- Original language: English
- No. of seasons: 1
- No. of episodes: 13

Production
- Production location: Treasure Island
- Cinematography: Peter Coleman
- Production company: Beyond Productions

Original release
- Network: Discovery Channel
- Release: October 15, 2008 – March 26, 2009

Related
- MythBusters

Prototype This! is an American television series with the stated goal to "look into the viability of gadgets and technology seen in science-fiction movies". The series premiered on October 15, 2008, on The Discovery Channel. It was filmed on Treasure Island in Building 180 and occasionally at Standard Metal Products in San Francisco.

The show follows a team of inventors:

- Doc North – Material Science, University of California, Santa Barbara
- Joe Grand – Bachelor of Science in Electrical Engineering, Boston University
- Terry Sandin – Special Effects Designer, Hollywood
- Dr. Andrew "Zoz" Brooks – 3 degrees from the University of Adelaide, namely, Bachelor of Science (organic chemistry & computer science), First Class Honours in computer science and a graduate diploma in education plus a master's from the Australian National University's robotics laboratory and a PhD from the Massachusetts Institute of Technology (MIT).

== Production ==
Although this show shares producers (Beyond Productions) and location (San Francisco Bay Area, California) with the TV series MythBusters, it is entirely distinct.

The pilot episode for the series was shot at TechShop in Menlo Park in December 2006. Three sets were constructed in TechShop's large conference room, and the machine shop and sheet metal shop were painted in color schemes that would look good on camera. Many parts of the TechShop facilities were used in the show pilot, including the main workshop, welding shop, and laser cutter room.

== Episodes ==
No.	Title	Original release date
1	"Mind Controlled Car"	October 15, 2008
Our team of inventors attempts to prototype a car that utilizes biofeedback sensors to restrict a car's performance as its driver’s agitation level increases. Joe and Zoz will use cutting edge biofeedback and mind control technologies as the brains of the prototypes while Terry and Mike retrofit the test cars for an extreme test to prove the concept: a demolition derby where road rage is inevitable.
2	"Boxing Robots"	October 22, 2008
The prototype team looks into the future of gaming — and giant, boxing robots are what they see. Joe and Zoz utilize a technology called optical glyph tracking to allow the robots to register and mimic their human counterparts’ boxing movements, while Mike is charged with dressing the metallic skeletons and Terry with building the metal beasts themselves. And then it’s into the boxing ring for a metallic monster slugfest!
3	"Traffic Busting Truck"	October 29, 2008
The boys take on the challenge of building a car that will beat traffic by rising up — and driving over it. And as an added bonus, the lift allows the vehicle to find parking like nothing else on wheels. The key to this build is a set of amazing wheels that can move in all directions without actually turning.
4	"Six-Legged All Terrain Vehicle"	November 5, 2008
Inspired by the "legs" of an innovative robot called RHex, the prototypers decide to use this basic design with its synchronized alternating tripod gait and build it BIG! What first appears as a simple upscaling project becomes a real challenge when the team discovers that size can change everything.
5	"Backyard Waterslide Simulator"	November 12, 2008
No water theme park is complete without a long run on a water slide, but what do you do when you don’t have the room in your backyard? Let the laws of physics give you a ride! In what may be their most massive build, the team puts together an amazing, fun-filled "slide-in-a-ring" and then turns on the hose for some aquatic fun.
6	"Firefighter Future Tech"	November 19, 2008
The team tries to revolutionize firefighting equipment. As they learned, hauling the heavy fire equipment up flights of stairs leaves firefighters tired, and with less oxygen in their tank. One of their challenges was to build a "Stairbot" to carry the equipment, and then convert into a rescue seat. The second challenge the team faced was to design an ergonomical "PyroPack" that would give our flamebustin' heroes the chance to save even more lives.
7	"Get Up And Go"	November 26, 2008
The team of engineers attempts to invent a space-age sleeping pod that gets you up, fed, showered, groomed, dressed, informed and out the door in a matter of minutes. Initial attempts to automate things like shaving and eating turn out to be either scary or messy, but some surprising breakthroughs pave the way for a triumphant public demonstration.
8	"Automated Pizza Delivery"	December 3, 2008
The team attempts to build an automated pizza delivery robot and automated pizza delivery car (see: driverless car), but only after scary attempts with massive blimps.
9	"Wearable Airbag"	December 10, 2008
The team attempts to invent a wearable airbag to protect construction workers in case they fall from high-rises.
10	"Virtual Sea Adventure"	December 17, 2008
The team attempts to invent a telepresence deep sea diving experience.
11	"Flying Life Guard"	March 12, 2009
The team tries to develop two flying-lifeguard systems to protect swimmers on unguarded beaches.
12	"Gecko Superhero Suit"	March 19, 2009
The team attempts to invent two devices for humans to scale a smooth vertical surface and to scale a rough vertical surface like a gecko does, calling the human either "Geckoman" or "Geckowoman."
13	"Robo Dog Sitter"	March 26, 2009
The team of inventors attempts to engineer the world's first robotic dog sitter. Designed to play with, let out and discipline your dog, the Robo Dog Sitter will also allow an owner at work to communicate with his dog via a monitor on the robot.
