= Dave Aitel =

American computer security professional (born 1976)

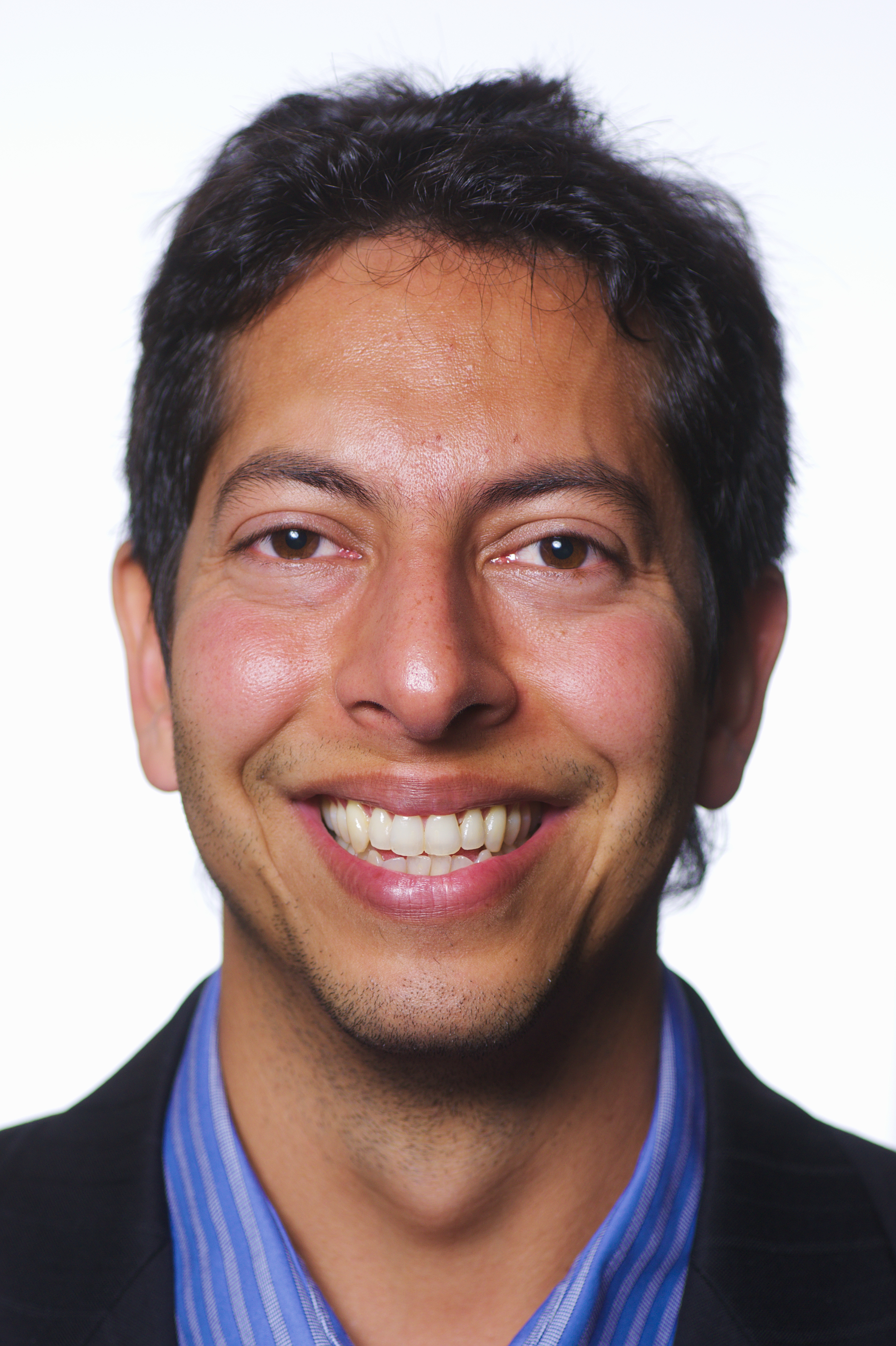
Aitel in 2012

Dave Aitel (born 1976) is a computer security professional. He joined the NSA as a research scientist aged 18 where he worked for six years before being employed as a consultant at @stake for three years. In 2002 he founded a security software company, Immunity, where he was the CTO up until December 31, 2020.

Aitel co-authored several books:

- The Hacker's Handbook: The Strategy Behind Breaking into and Defending Networks. ISBN 978-0-8493-0888-8
- The Shellcoder's Handbook. ISBN 978-0-7645-4468-2
- Beginning Python. ISBN 978-0-7645-9654-4

He has also written several security tools:

- SPIKE, a block-based fuzzer
- SPIKE Proxy, a man-in-the-middle web application assessment tool
- Unmask, a tool to do statistical analysis on text to determine authorship

Dave Aitel is an infrequent guest on the Fox News Channel, where he provides commentary on information security news.
