= Mark Kriegsman =

Entrepreneur and software engineer (born 1966)

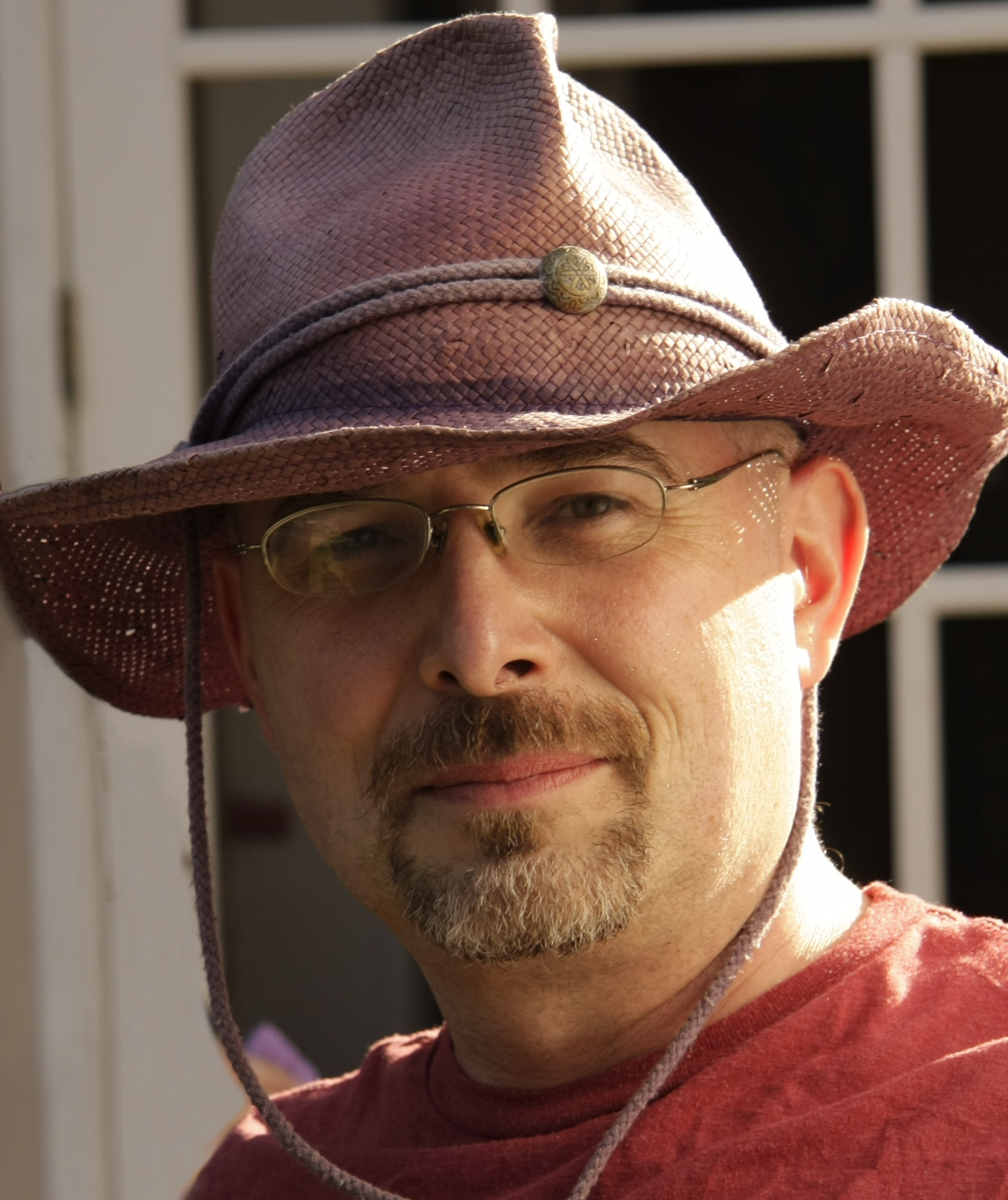
- Born: 1966 (age 59–60)
- Citizenship: American
- Education: Hampshire College

Mark Edwin Kriegsman (born 1966) is an American entrepreneur, computer programmer, inventor, writer, and former Director of Engineering at Veracode.

== Open source, web, and software security work ==
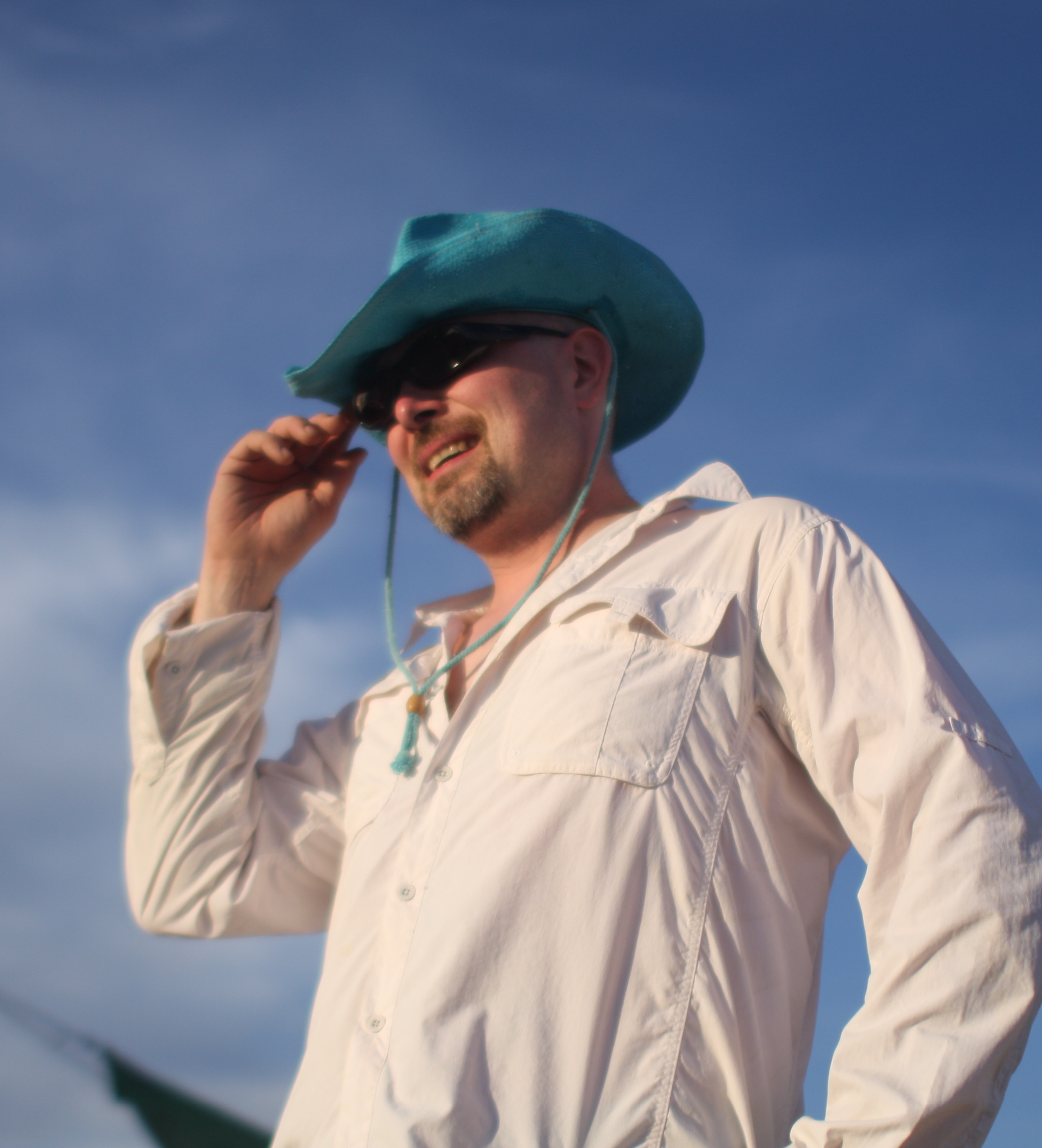
At the Burning Man 2008 festival

Kriegsman has been writing and porting open-source software for 30 years. He founded and ran pioneering software companies, including Document.com, later acquired by Merrill, and Clearway Technologies, acquired by Mirror Image Internet. After college, Kriegsman worked for Cognitive Systems, Inc. (started by notable AI researcher Roger Schank), developing large scale rule-based, statistical, and text-processing AI systems. He later integrated those three technologies in a paper he wrote for IEEE. Designing document management systems at Interleaf led him to found his first startup, Document.com. After founding Clearway, Kriegsman was a senior developer at @stake, which was later acquired by Symantec.

Clearway created the FireSite web accelerator and content delivery network, and the early WebArcher internet search tool. In late 1998, Clearway was involved in an early ad-blocking controversy. Its release of the ad blocking web software AdScreen angered its user base and spurred a lively discussion of the role of advertisements in web publishing. Based on user feedback, Clearway pulled AdScreen just two days later.

Kriegsman is an active participant in several, often overlapping, areas of software development. He is one of the founders of Veracode, reflecting a long-standing interest in software security. He is also, however, interested in both secure information sharing and has been an outspoken skeptic of what he sees as shady business practices in the computer industry.

== Background ==
Kriegsman's fascination with computers caught the attention of a local newspaper in 1979, when he was 13. Lucy Meyer of the New Jersey Summit Herald reported that "Mark... likes to make up programs, sometimes patterns and sometimes short programs 'that just pop into my head.' He parlayed this skill and interest into writing computer games; at age 15 he released his first game, "StarBlaster", and later his second, "Panic Button."

He graduated from Hampshire College in Amherst Massachusetts, where he studied cognitive science. After graduation, Kriegsman worked for Cognitive Systems, Inc., and later went on to found several successful technology companies, starting with Document.com and later including Clearway and Veracode.

Kriegsman is a descendant of William Bradford, leader of the Plymouth Colony in Massachusetts, as well as of early Santa Fe merchants Willi and Flora Spiegelberg. Willi was the Mayor of Santa Fe from 1884–1886.

He lives in Massachusetts with his child Ness.

== Patents ==
Kriegsman holds the following patents:

Patents concerning Content Delivery Networks and Systems:

- US Patent 5,991,809, 1999
- US Patent 6,370,580, 2002
- US Patent 6,480,893, 2002
- US Patent 6,915,329, 2005

Patent concerning dynamic web page assembly and caching:

- US Patent 7,890,571, 2011

== Publications ==
- Kriegsman, Mark. "Two Fancy Tone Generators." Apple Assembly Line 1:9, June 1981.
- Kriegsman, Mark and Ralph Barletta. "Building a Case-Based Help Desk Application." IEEE Expert 8:6, 1993.
