= Christien Rioux =

American computer programmer

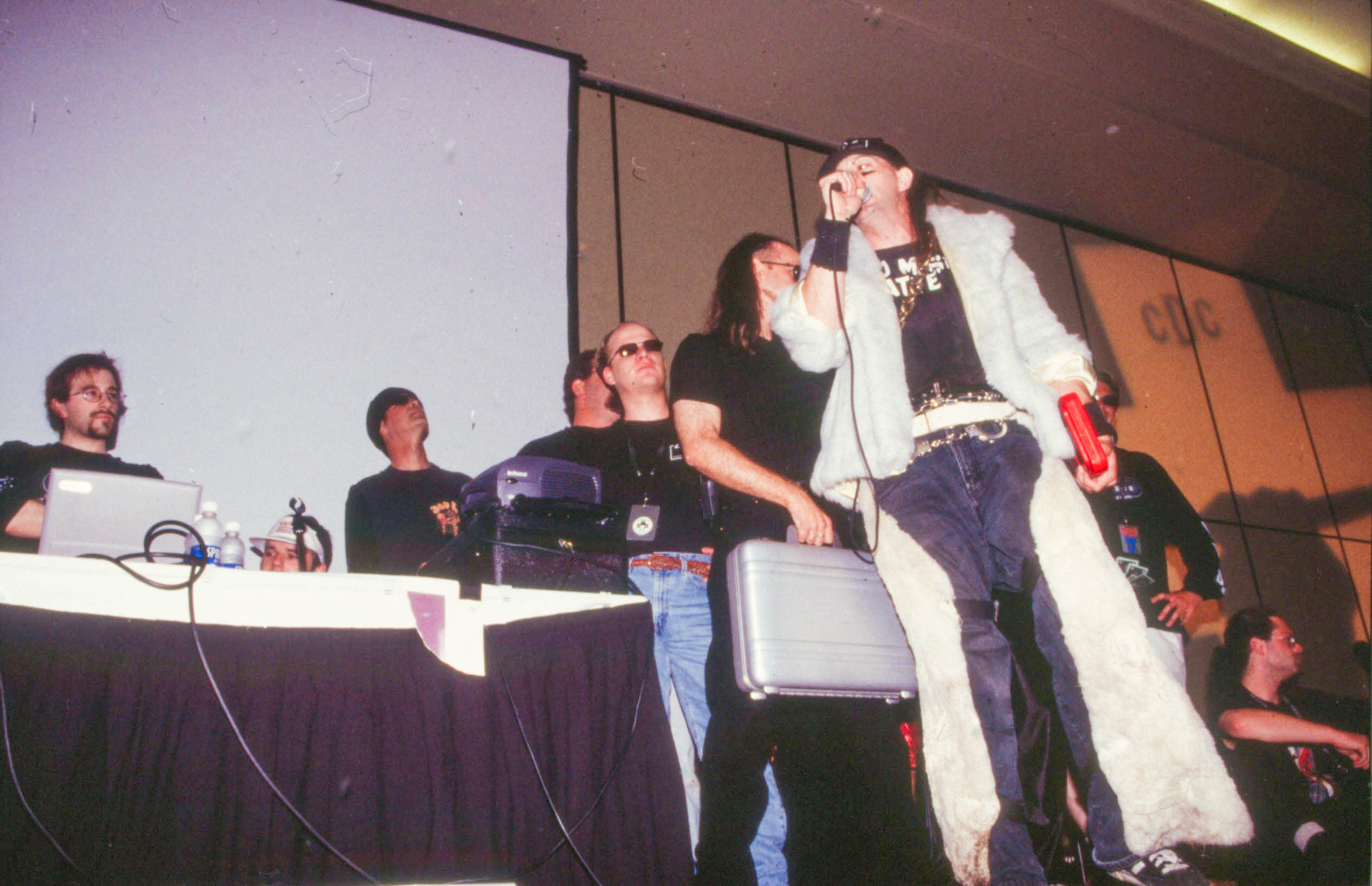
- Dildog (left) and Grand Master Ratte during the Cult of the Dead Cow (cDc) show at Defcon 8
- Citizenship: American
- Education: Massachusetts Institute of Technology
- Known for: Security
- Scientific career
- Fields: Computer science
- Workplaces: L0pht @stake Symantec; Veracode

Christien Rioux, also known by his handle DilDog, is the co-founder and chief scientist for the Burlington, Massachusetts based company Veracode, for which he is the main patent holder.

Educated at MIT, Rioux was a computer security researcher at L0pht Heavy Industries and then at the company @stake (later bought by Symantec). While at @stake, he looked for security weaknesses in software and led the development of Smart Risk Analyzer (SRA). He co-authored the best-selling Windows password auditing tool @stake LC (L0phtCrack) and the AntiSniff network intrusion detection system.

He is also a member of Cult of the Dead Cow and its Ninja Strike Force. Formerly, he was a member of L0pht.

DilDog is best known as the author of the original code for Back Orifice 2000, an open source remote administration tool. He is also well known as the author of "The Tao of Windows Buffer Overflow."
