= Peiter Zatko =

American computer security expert

Peiter "Mudge" Zatko
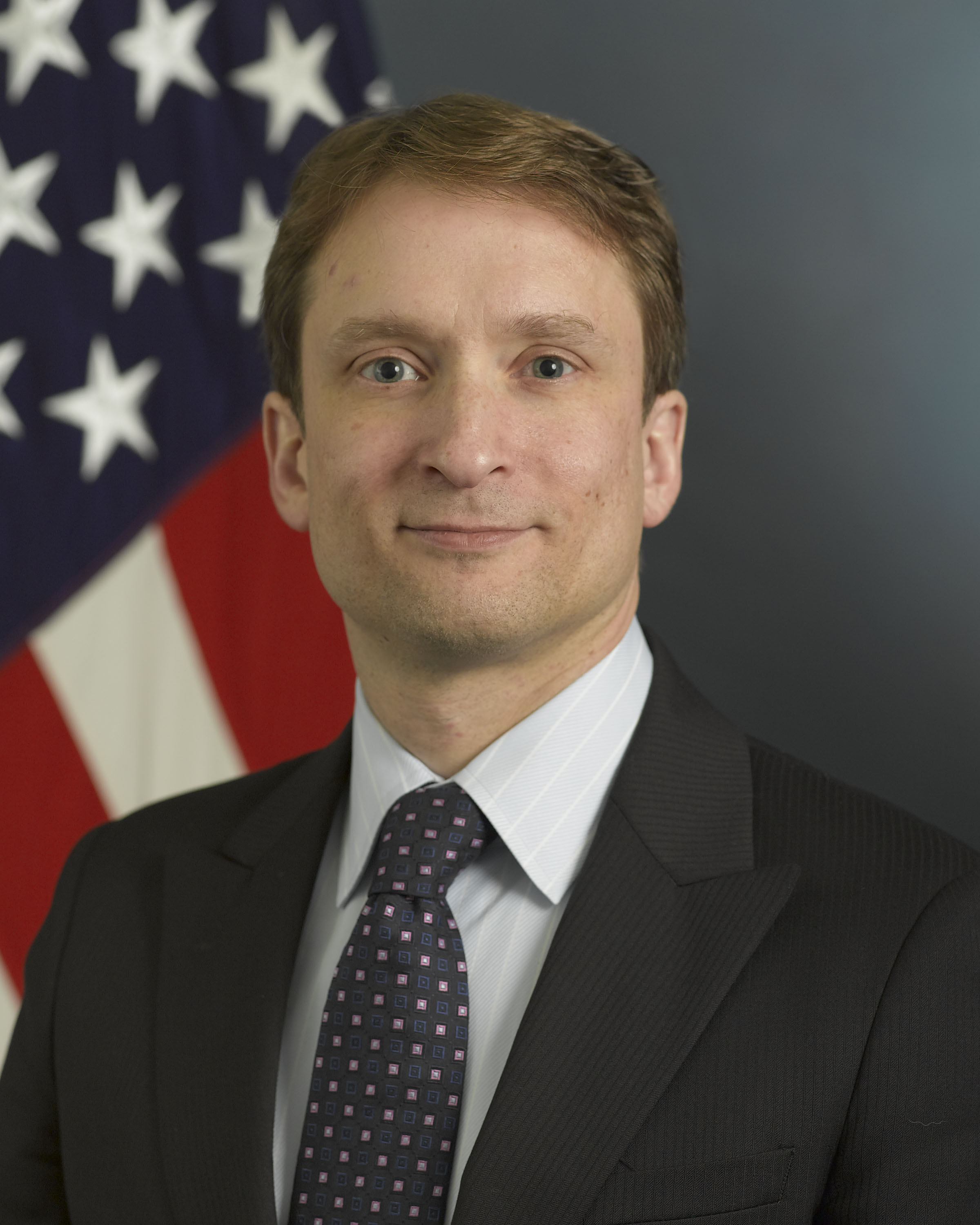
- Mudge during his tenure at DARPA
- Born: December 1, 1970 (age 55); Alabama, U.S.
- Education: Berklee College of Music
- Known for: L0pht, L0phtcrack, DARPA Cyber Fast Track, testimony to the Senate, Cult of the Dead Cow
- Awards: Secretary of Defense Exceptional Civilian Service Award, Order of Thor
- Scientific career
- Fields: Computer Science; Public administration Hacker
- Workplaces: Google, Motorola, DARPA, L0pht, Twitter

Peiter C. Zatko, better known as Mudge, is an American network security expert, open source programmer, writer, and hacker. He is currently the chief information officer of DARPA. He was the most prominent member of the high-profile hacker think tank the L0pht as well as the computer and culture hacking cooperative the Cult of the Dead Cow.

While involved with the L0pht, Mudge contributed to disclosure and education on information and security vulnerabilities. In addition to pioneering buffer overflow work, the security advisories he released contained early examples of flaws in the following areas: code injection, race condition, side-channel attack, exploitation of embedded systems, and cryptanalysis of commercial systems. He was the original author of the password cracking software L0phtCrack.

In 2010, Mudge accepted a position as a program manager at DARPA where he oversaw cyber security research. In 2013, Mudge went to work for Google in their Advanced Technology & Projects division. In 2020, he was hired as head of security at Twitter. In 2023 he started working at the security consulting firm Rapid7 that develops Metasploit.

== Biography ==
Born in December 1970, Mudge graduated from the Berklee College of Music at the top of his class and is an adept guitar player.

Mudge was responsible for early research into a type of security vulnerability known as the buffer overflow. In 1995 he published "How to Write Buffer Overflows", one of the first papers on the topic. He published some of the first security advisories and research demonstrating early vulnerabilities in Unix such as code injection, side-channel attacks, and information leaks, and was a leader in the full disclosure movement. He was the initial author of security tools L0phtCrack, AntiSniff, and l0phtwatch.

Mudge was one of the first people from the hacker community to reach out and build relationships with government and industry. In demand as a public speaker, he spoke at hacker conferences such as DEF CON and academic conferences such as USENIX. Mudge has also been a member of Cult of the Dead Cow since 1996. He was one of the seven L0pht members who testified before a Senate committee in 1998 about the serious vulnerabilities of the Internet at that time. The L0pht became the computer security consultancy @stake in 1999, and Mudge became the vice president of research and development and later chief scientist.

In 2000, after the first crippling Internet distributed denial-of-service attacks, he was invited to meet with President Bill Clinton at a security summit alongside cabinet members and industry executives.

== Career ==
In 2004 Zatko became a division scientist at government contractor BBN Technologies, where he originally worked in the 1990s, and also joined the technical advisory board of NFR Security. In 2010, it was announced that he would be project manager of a DARPA project focused on directing research in cyber security. In 2013 he announced that he would leave DARPA for a position at Google ATAP. In 2015 Zatko announced on Twitter he would join a project called #CyberUL, a testing organisation for computer security inspired by Underwriters Laboratories, mandated by the White House.

=== DARPA ===
At DARPA he created the Cyber Analytical Framework the agency used to evaluate DoD investments in offensive and defensive cyber security. During his tenure he ran at least three Department of Defense (DoD) programs known as Military Networking Protocol (MNP), Cyber-Insider Threat (CINDER), and Cyber Fast Track (CFT).

Military Networking Protocol (MNP) provided network prioritization with full user-level attribution for military computer networks.

CINDER focused on identifying cyber espionage conducted by virtual insider threats such as future variants of Stuxnet or Duqu. CINDER is often mistakenly associated with WikiLeaks in the media. This is possibly due to the confusion between DARPA programs focused on identifying human insider threat such as ADAMS and the identification of software espionage posed by malware in the CINDER program. This issue was clarified by Mudge in his Defcon 2011 keynote at 46 minutes and 11 seconds into the talk.

Cyber Fast Track (CFT) provided resources and funding to security research, including programs run by hackers, hackerspaces, and makerlabs. The program provided an alternative to traditional government contracting vehicles that was accessible to individuals and small companies previously unable to work within the cumbersome and complicated DARPA process. The novel contracting effort had an averaging time of 7 days from receipt of proposal to funding being provided to the proposing research organization. The program was initially announced at Shmoocon during his 2011 keynote.

On August 7, 2024, he announced on X.com (Twitter) that he had returned to DARPA as part of the leadership team, as DARPA's Chief Information Officer (CIO).

=== Twitter ===
Zatko was hired by Jack Dorsey, Twitter's then CEO, in November 2020 to lead the company's information security approach, after a July 2020 hack that compromised multiple high-profile accounts. He was terminated by the company in January 2022, with Twitter claiming it was after "an assessment of how the organization was being led and the impact on top priority work".

On 23 August 2022, the contents of a whistleblower complaint made by Zatko to the United States Congress were published. The complaint alleges Twitter committed multiple violations of United States securities regulations, the Federal Trade Commission Act of 1914, and a 2011 enforceable consent decree reached with the Federal Trade Commission after several issues between 2007 and 2010. He also accused Twitter of "extreme, egregious deficiencies" in its handling of user information and spam bots. Zatko accused several Twitter executives, including Parag Agrawal and certain board members, of making false or misleading statements about privacy, security, and content moderation on the platform in violation of the Federal Trade Commission Act of 1914 and SEC disclosure rules. These included misrepresentations to Elon Musk made during the course of his acquisition bid, with the complaint specifically calling Agrawal's May 16 thread deceptive. The Wall Street Journal reported that Twitter reached a confidential $7 million settlement with Zatko in June, following his firing. The settlement prohibits Zatko from speaking publicly about his time at Twitter or disparaging the company, with the exception of Congressional hearings and governmental whistleblower complaints. On 13 September 2022, Zatko testified before the Senate Judiciary Committee.

== Personal life ==
On 11 August 2007 he married Sarah Lieberman, a co-worker at BBN and former mathematician at the National Security Agency. Remarking about her husband’s time at Twitter in an article in Time Magazine, she said, "dishonesty is definitely something that frustrates him."

== Awards ==
- 2013 Office of the Secretary of Defense Exceptional Public Service Award
- 2011 SC Magazine Top 5 influential IT security thinkers of the year
- 2007 Boston Business Journal 40 under 40

== Refereed papers ==
- An Architecture for Scalable Network Defense, Proceedings of the 34th Annual IEEE Conference on Local Computer Networks (LCN), Strayer, Miliken, Watro, Heimerdinger, Harp, Goldman, Spicuzza, Schwartz, Mankins, Kong, and Zatko., Proceedings of the 34th Annual IEEE Conference on Local Computer Networks (LCN), October 2009.
- SLINGbot: A System for Live Investigation of Next Generation Botnets, Alden Jackson, David Lapsley, Christine Jones, Mudge Zatko, Chaos Golubitsky, and W. Timothy Strayer, Proceedings of Cybersecurity Applications and Technologies Conference for Homeland Security (CATCH), Washington, D.C., March 2009.
- Security Analysis of the Palm Operating System and its Weaknesses Against Malicious Code Threats, Joe Grand and Mudge, 10th Usenix Security Symposium, Washington, D.C., August 2001.
- Cryptanalysis of Microsoft's PPTP Authentication Extensions (MSCHAPv2), Bruce Schneier, Mudge, and David A. Wagner, Secure Networking CQRE [Secure] 1999, International Exhibition and Congress, Springer Lecture Notes in Computer Science, no. 1740, pp. 192–203, Nov/Dec, 1999.
- Cryptanalysis of Microsoft's Point-to-Point Tunneling Protocol (PPTP), Bruce Schneier and Mudge, Fifth ACM Conference on Communications and Computer Security, pages 132–141, March 1998.

== L0pht Security advisories and software ==
Mudge published numerous papers and advisories detailing security problems across different applications and operating systems and was a pioneering champion of full disclosure.

- Crontab buffer overflow vulnerabilities, Oct 2001
- Initial Cryptanalysis of the RSA SecurID Algorithm, Jan 2001
- AntiSniff: Identification of remote systems in promiscuous mode, May 2000
- Race conditions within RedHat Linux initscripts, Dec 2000
- Reverse Engineering Cactus Software shell-lock obfuscation techniques, Oct 1999
- Solaris /bin/su side channel attack, June 1999
- L0pht Watch: A tool for filesystem race condition attacks, Jan 1999
- Hash disclosure vulnerabilities in Quakenbush Windows NT Password Appraiser, Jan 1999
- suGuard privilege escalation attack, Jan 1999
- Embedded FORTH Hacking on Sparc Hardware, Phrack Magazine, Volume 8, Issue 53, July 1998
- Race Condition in Rational Systems ClearCase source control system, Jan 1998
- Imap 4.1 remote memory dump and retrieval of sensitive information, Oct 1997
- L0phtCrack: Technical rant on vulnerabilities in Microsoft encryption and passwords, July 1997
- Root Compromise through Solaris libc_getopt(3), Jan 1997
- BSD distributions of modstat allow compromise of DES keys, passwords, and ring 0 control, Dec 1996
- Kerberos 4 memory leaks provide sensitive credential information via remote attacks, Nov 1996
- Privilege escalation through Sendmail 8.7.5 GECOS buffer overflow vulnerability, Nov 1996
- cgi-bin/test-cgi parsing vulnerabilities allow remote directory traversal, April 1996
- Design weaknesses in the SecurID authentication system, 1996
- MONKey: An attack on the s/key one-time-password system, 1995
