= Electrical disruptions caused by squirrels =

Animal disruptions of power grids

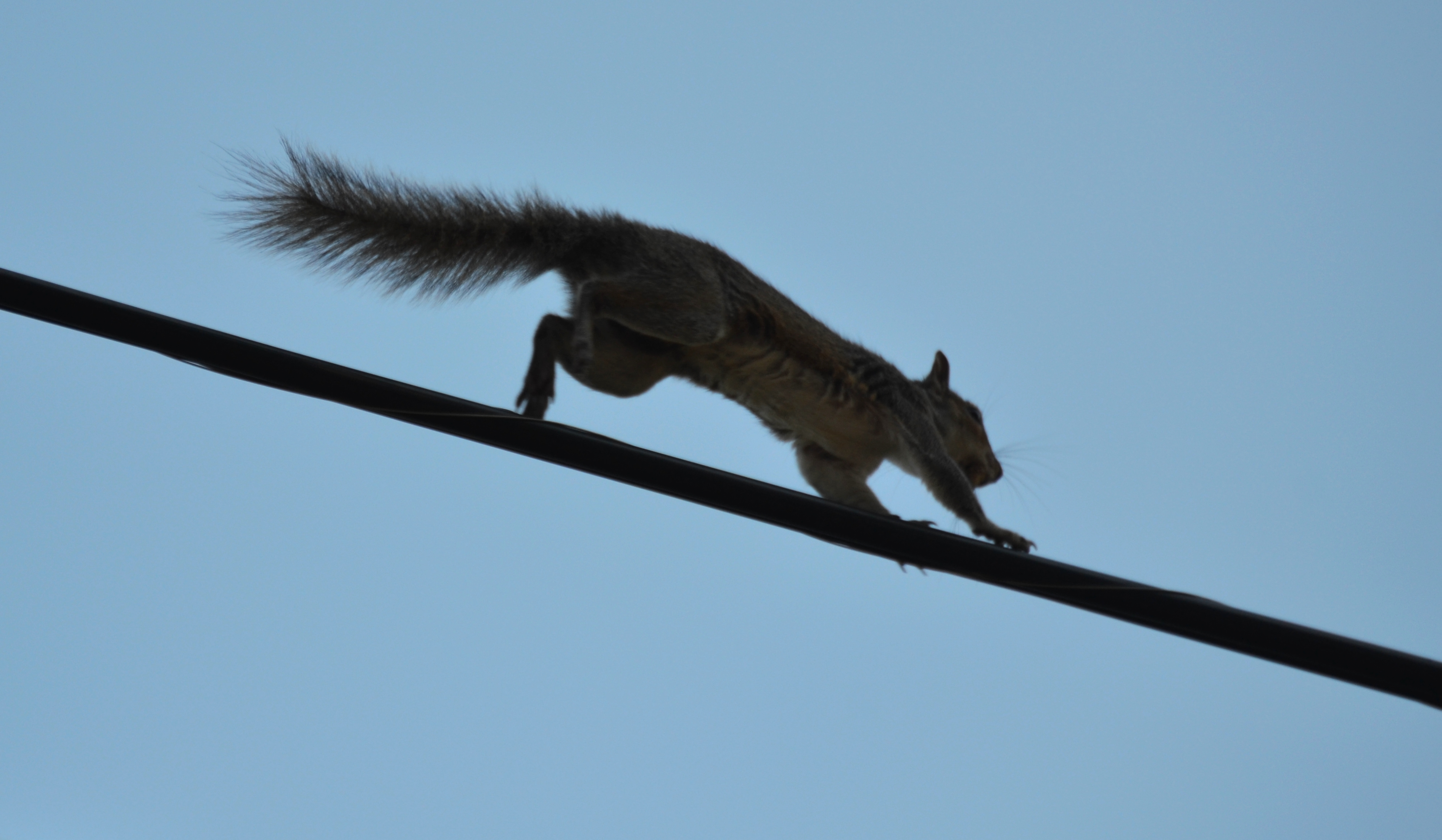
Squirrel running along utility line

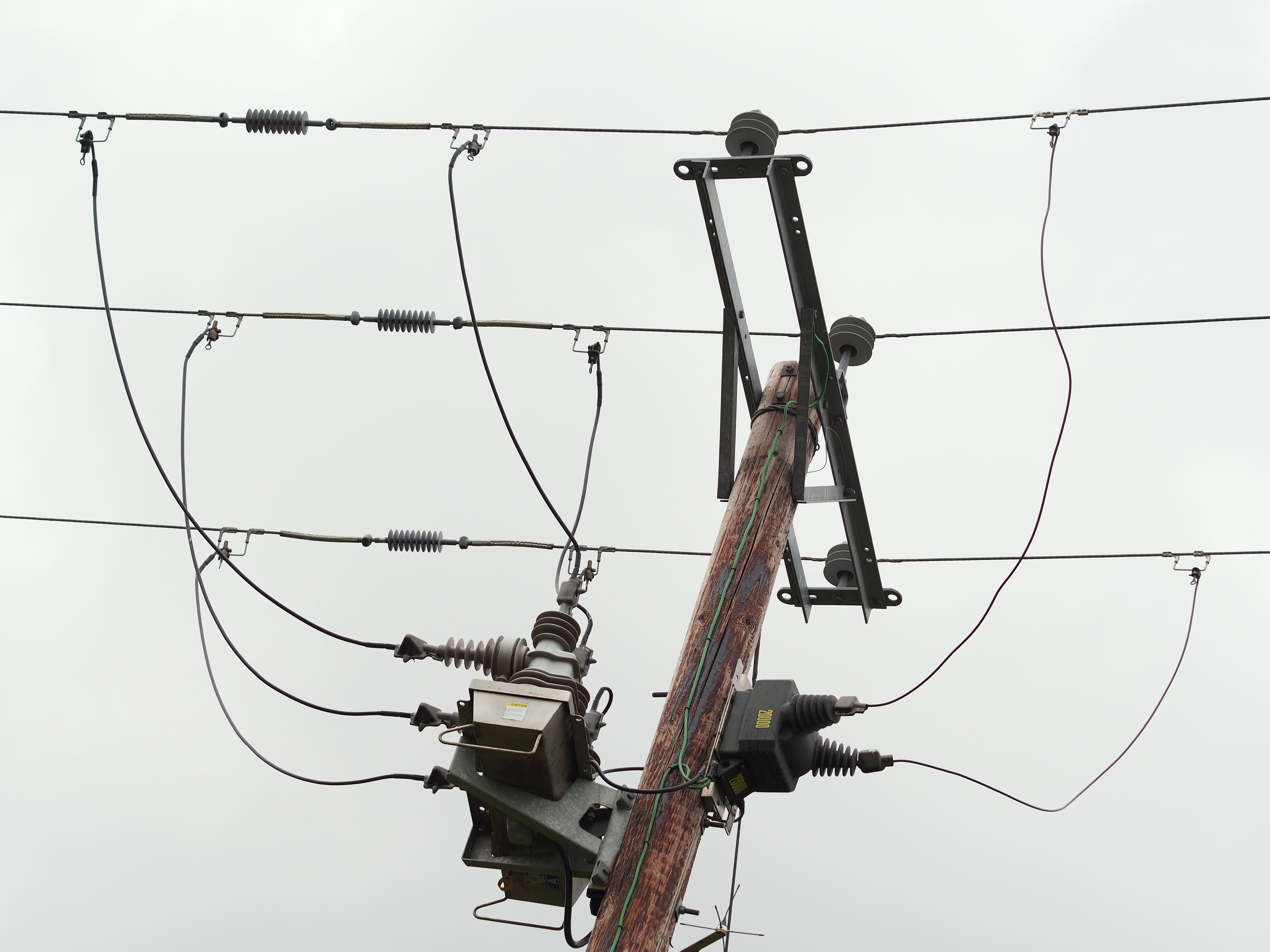
A squirrel can disrupt a power system if its body becomes a current path between electrical lines such as those seen here.

Electrical disruptions caused by squirrels are common and widespread, and can involve the disruption of power grids. It has been hypothesized that the threat to the internet, infrastructure and services posed by squirrels may exceed that posed by cyber-attacks. Although many commentators have highlighted humorous aspects of the concern, squirrels have proven consistently able to cripple power grids in many countries, and the danger posed to the electrical grid from squirrels is ongoing and significant. This has led to tabulations and maps compiled of the relevant data.

== Scope ==
Electrical disruptions caused by squirrels are common and widespread. Between Memorial Day (May 27, 2013) and August 31, 2013, at least 50 power outages caused by squirrels were recorded in 24 U.S. states. Cities affected by squirrel-related power outages included Mason City, Iowa and Portland, Oregon. Most media coverage of such events has compared the number of electrical grid shutdowns due to squirrels and those due to terrorists. Commentators often embellish and parody descriptions of the squirrels responsible for interrupting electrical service with allusions to military action or concerns, for example: "Squirrels mobilize [and] plot acts of cyber terrorism against humankind [...] and they're not acting alone." or "Squirrelus interruptus: 5 things shut down by squirrels— how can a squirrel bring a nuclear weapons site to its knees?" Electrical grids are not the only types of infrastructure at risk from squirrels, but nuclear weapons sites have also been described as targets of squirrel attention. Ground squirrels have interfered with underground nuclear missile sites at Malmstrom Air Force Base in Montana. The squirrels are able to tunnel under fences, bypassing motion detectors. Like their arboreal relatives, they can damage electrical cables by biting them. In addition, those that do take above-ground routes onto the base trigger thousands of false alarms each year.

== Prevention ==
Squirrels damage electrical distribution facilities by tunneling, by chewing through electrical insulation, or by simultaneously coming into contact with two conductors at different electrical potentials, their bodies acting as a bridge that spans the two. Typically the animal is killed by the passage of current through its body. Prevention is complicated by the ability of squirrels to bypass plastic animal guards, gnaw through insulation and squeeze through small openings into substations.

== Metrics ==
Squirrel-caused grid disruption in the U.S. is monitored by the American Public Power Association (APPA). The APPA has developed a data tracker called "The Squirrel Index" (TSqI) to analyze the pattern and timing of "squirrel attacks" on electrical power systems. The TSqI is a metric that quantifies the rate per 1,000 customers over a period of time, and indicates two peak periods of highest "squirrel activity" or "squirrel peaking months" (SqPMS) in the year, in May–June and October–November, when disruption is greatest.

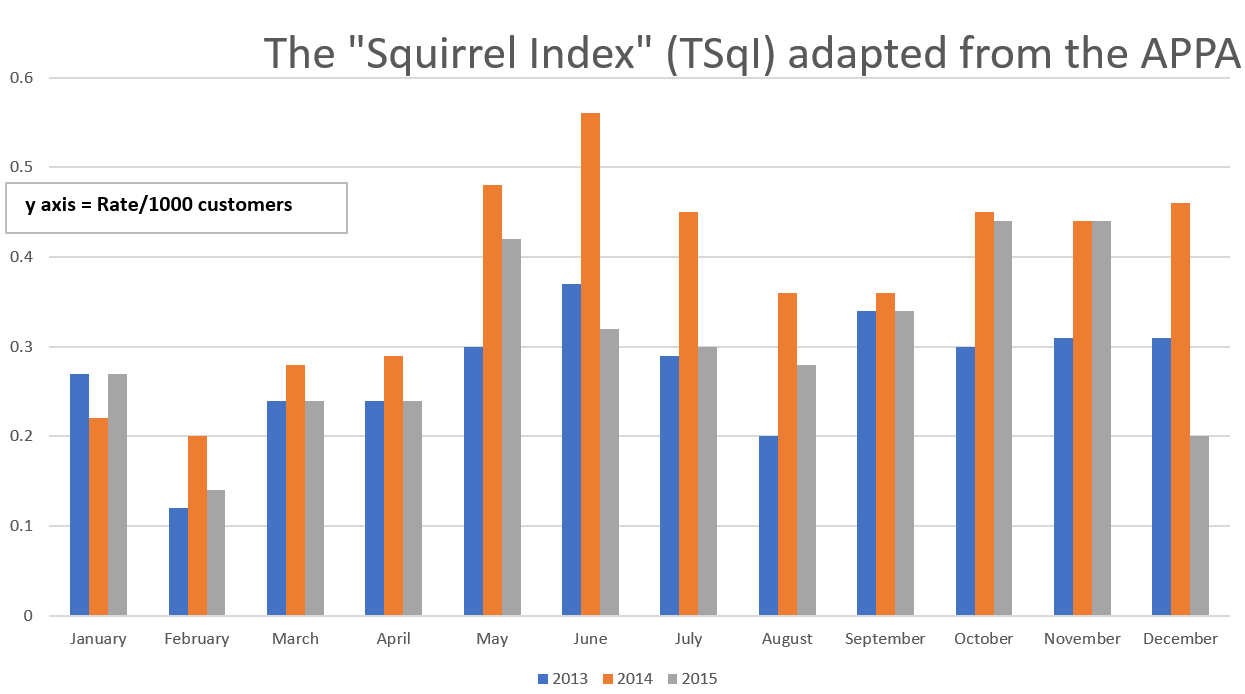
This is the rate per 1000 electrical customers and squirrel related outages

== Analytics ==
According to a survey made by one security expert, the real threat to critical infrastructure located around the globe is from the squirrels. It has been discovered that squirrels are causing more damage to critical infrastructure than cyber wars launched by enemy states or organizations.

Intentional damage by human terrorists is often the first concern in assessing threats to the U.S. power supply; some cybersecurity experts believe a country's infrastructure, such as its power grid, is a likely terrorist target. But according to the security researcher Cris Thomas, also known by the pseudonym Space Rogue, "We've had power outages caused by squirrels in all 50 states ... [including] Hawaii, where they don't even have squirrels, but they do have chickens."

== Specific cases ==
In 1987 a 90-minute loss of power to Nasdaq's automated trading computer, caused by a squirrel, affected twenty million trades. Nasdaq was shut down for about 30 minutes again in 2014 by a squirrel-induced power outage. Other commentators have noted that actual cyber attacks by human terrorists are much rarer than disruption caused by squirrels.

John C. Inglis, the former deputy director of the U.S. National Security Agency, said in 2015 that he judged the electrical grid was as likely to be paralyzed by a natural disaster as by a cyberattack and added: "[F]rankly, the No. 1 threat experienced to date by the U.S. electrical grid is squirrels."

Similar concerns exist in Germany, where in 2005, a "cyber squirrel" crippled the entire electrical grid south of the River Elster for an hour. This squirrel was described as "a furry suicide bomber" ("pelzige[r] Selbstmordattentäter").

Squirrels have been the cause of many power outages in Pennsylvania. (Note: Such incidents have been reported in Connellsville, Kittaning, Tarentum, West Mifflin, Springdale, Sharon, Smethport, State College, Cumberland County, New Cumberland, Middletown, Columbia, Lancaster, Muncy, Tamaqua, Pennsylvania, Schuylkill Haven, Pennsylvania, Hamburg, and Laureldale.) Cris Thomas has said that as of January 2017 in the United States there have been six deaths associated with squirrel interference with infrastructure, such as downed power lines (and two with other animals).

One commentator criticized the UK press for what he saw as an emphasis on "the ethnic struggle between Britain's populations of red and grey squirrels, and the latter's demonization (as immigrants and terrorists) and threatened eradication". In at least one circumstance, a physical attack by a squirrel has been characterized as a "terrorist squirrel."

== Humor ==
At BruCon 2012, Joshua Corman and Brian Martin gave a presentation titled "Cyberwar: Not what we were expecting" in which they showed a U.S. and world map of states and countries known to have power outages due to squirrels and other animals.

This data was then used later by Cris Thomas who created Cyber Squirrel 1 and carried the concept further. The project documents the events as if they were "cyber war ops", while the undocumented events "remain classified".

== See also ==
- Animal attack
