= Grey hat hacker =

Hacker who operates without permission or malice

A grey hat hacker is a hacker who tries to obey the spirit of the law and of professional ethics, while not always following the letter of it. They are positioned in between white hat hackers and black hat hackers.

The term was first used in print in the late 1990s by the hacker group L0pht in a 1999 interview with The New York Times to describe their hacking activities. The same article describes several members as black hat hackers and a third party describes L0pht as white-hat hackers.

== Definitions ==
- When a white hat hacker discovers a vulnerability, they will exploit it only with permission and not divulge its existence until it has been fixed, whereas the black hat will illegally exploit it and/or tell others how to do so. The grey hat will neither illegally exploit it, nor tell others how to do so. The phrase was used to describe hackers who support the ethical reporting of vulnerabilities directly to the software vendor in contrast to the full disclosure practices that were prevalent in the white hat community that vulnerabilities not be disclosed outside of their group.
- The Red Hat Linux Security Guide states that the white hat breaks into systems and networks at the request of their employer or with explicit permission for the purpose of determining how secure it is against hackers, whereas the black hat will break into any system or network in order to uncover sensitive information for personal gain. The grey hat generally has the skills and intent of the white hat but may break into any system or network without permission.
- Systemic Connect state that grey hat hackers, discovering a vulnerability, will tell the hacker community as well as the company affected and then "watch the fallout."
- In 2008, the EFF defined grey hats as ethical security researchers who inadvertently or arguably violate the law in an effort to research and improve security. They advocate for computer offense laws that are clearer and more narrowly drawn.

Another definition of grey hat maintains that grey hat hackers only arguably violate the law in an effort to research and improve security: legality being set according to the particular ramifications of any hacks they participate in.

In the search engine optimization (SEO) community, grey hat hackers are those who manipulate websites' search engine rankings using improper or unethical means but that are not considered search engine spam.

A 2021 research study looked into the psychological characteristics of individuals that participate in hacking in the workforce. The findings indicate that grey hat hackers typically go against authority, black hat hackers have a strong tendency toward thrill-seeking, and white hat hackers often exhibit narcissistic traits.

== Examples ==
In April 2000, hackers known as "{}" and "Hardbeat" gained unauthorized access to Apache.org. They chose to alert Apache crew of the problems rather than try to damage the Apache.org servers.

In August 2013, Khalil Shreateh, an unemployed computer security researcher, exploited a Facebook vulnerability to post a message on the wall of founder Mark Zuckerberg after the company's bug bounty program had dismissed his report. Facebook fixed the vulnerability but refused to pay Shreateh a bounty, saying his demonstration on a real account had violated its responsible disclosure terms; the case was widely reported as an example of grey hat disclosure.
