= SQL Slammer =

2003 computer worm

Malware details
- Type: Computer worm
- Origin: 2003

Technical details
- Platform: Microsoft Windows

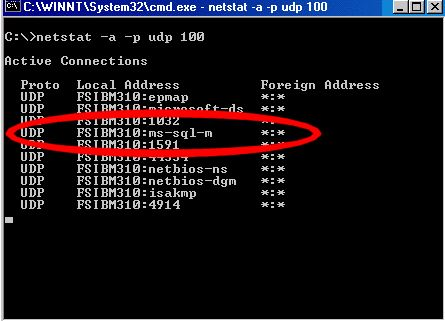
SQL Slammer Computer worm.

SQL Slammer (Note: Other names include W32.SQLExp.Worm, DDOS.SQLP1434.A, the Sapphire Worm, SQL_HEL, W32/SQLSlammer and Helkern.) is a 2003 computer worm that caused a denial of service on some Internet hosts and dramatically slowed general Internet traffic. It also crashed routers around the world, causing even more slowdowns. It spread rapidly, infecting most of its 75,000 victims within 10 minutes.

The program exploited a buffer overflow bug in Microsoft's SQL Server and Desktop Engine database products. Although the MS02-039 (CVE-2002-0649) patch had been released six months earlier, many organizations had not yet applied it.

== Technical details ==
The worm was based on proof of concept code demonstrated at the Black Hat Briefings by David Litchfield, who had initially discovered the buffer overflow vulnerability that the worm exploited. It is a small piece of code that does little other than generate random IP addresses and send itself out to those addresses. If a selected address happens to belong to a host that is running an unpatched copy of Microsoft SQL Server Resolution Service listening on UDP port 1434, the host immediately becomes infected and begins spraying the Internet with more copies of the worm program.

Home PCs are generally not vulnerable to this worm unless they have MSDE installed. The worm is so small that it does not contain code to write itself to disk, so it only stays in memory, and it is easy to remove. For example, Symantec provides a free of charge removal utility, or it can even be removed by restarting SQL Server (although the machine would likely be reinfected immediately).

The worm was made possible by a software security vulnerability in SQL Server first reported by Microsoft on 24 July 2002. A patch had been available from Microsoft for six months prior to the worm's launch, but many installations had not been patched – including many at Microsoft.

The worm began to be noticed early on 25 January 2003 (Note: Public disclosure began with Michael Bacarella posting a message to the Bugtraq security mailing list entitled "MS SQL WORM IS DESTROYING INTERNET BLOCK PORT 1434!" at 07:11:41 UTC on 25 January 2003. Similar reports were posted by Robert Boyle at 08:35 UTC and Ben Koshy at 10:28 UTC An early analysis released by Symantec is timestamped 07:45 GMT.) as it slowed systems worldwide. The slowdown was caused by the collapse of numerous routers under the burden of extremely high bombardment traffic from infected servers. Normally, when traffic is too high for routers to handle, the routers are supposed to delay or temporarily stop network traffic. Instead, some routers crashed (became unusable), and the "neighbour" routers would notice that these routers had stopped and should not be contacted (aka "removed from the routing table"). Routers started sending notices to this effect to other routers they knew about. The flood of routing table update notices caused some additional routers to fail, compounding the problem. Eventually the crashed routers' maintainers restarted them, causing them to announce their status, leading to another wave of routing table updates. Soon a significant portion of Internet bandwidth was consumed by routers communicating with each other to update their routing tables, and ordinary data traffic slowed or in some cases stopped altogether. Because the SQL Slammer worm was so small in size, sometimes it got through even when legitimate traffic could not.

Two key aspects contributed to SQL Slammer's rapid propagation. The worm infected new hosts over the sessionless UDP protocol, and the entire worm (only 376 bytes) fits inside a single packet. Each infected host would simply "fire and forget" packets as rapidly as possible.

The worm left a majority of Bank of America's 13,000 automated teller machines unable to process customer transactions. In Korea, almost all customers of KT, one of the country's two largest internet service providers, lost their connections. The worm also led to cancelled airline flights.
