= Humanyze =

- Type: C Corporation
- Industry: Internet, Software, Computer Hardware
- Predecessor: Sociometric Solutions Inc.
- Founded: 2010
- Founders: Ben Waber (CEO); Daniel Olguin (COO/CFO); Taemie Kim (Chief Scientist); Tuomas Jaanu (CTO); Alex "Sandy" Pentland
- Headquarters: Boston, MA
- Website: www.humanyze.com

Humanyze, founded as Sociometric Solutions in 2010 in Boston, Massachusetts, is a people analytics software provider. Humanyze was founded by MIT doctoral students Ben Waber, Daniel Olguin, Taemie Kim, Tuomas Jaanu, and MIT Professor Alex Pentland. Humanyze's people analytics platform is based on research from the MIT Media Lab people analytics and utilizes Organizational Network Analysis to measure corporate communication data, identifying patterns in how companies operate.

== Company history ==
Waber, Olguin, Kim, and Jaanu met while pursuing their Ph.D's at the MIT Media Lab in Professor “Sandy” Pentland's Human Dynamics group. Sociometric Solutions Inc. was incorporated on October 26, 2010, as a research and consulting firm. In 2015, the company rebranded itself as "Humanyze" and transitioned to a software company. They launched their people analytics software, the Humanyze Platform, at the end of 2016.

During their time at the MIT Media Lab, Humanyze's founders developed a sociometric badge, a high-tech I.D. card. This badge used sensors to measure the frequency and duration of face-to-face interactions. It didn't record content, web activity, or personal activities, and it didn't have GPS. The Sociometric Badge has since been discontinued for commercial use, as the Humanyze Platform evolved to primarily work with digital collaboration data and corporate-owned building entry card systems.

In October 2021, the company officially received patents for its system and method for transforming communication metadata and sensor data into an objective measure of an organization's communication distribution.

== Products ==
Humanyze's people analytics platform measures corporate communication data to uncover patterns in workplace interactions. The platform is used for analyzing workplace data and making data-driven decisions related to organizational health, workplace strategy, and business process optimization. It is a web-based dashboard. A variety of data sources can be plugged into the Humanyze Platform including Microsoft Office Exchange, Google Suite, Skype, Microsoft Teams, HR information system outputs, and building access card logs.

== Research ==
During their time at the MIT Media Lab, Humanyze's founders focused on measuring communication patterns by analyzing the frequency and duration of communication instead of communication content. This approach was found to be more effective in understanding workplace interactions.

The founders have published research articles related to their work at Humanyze. One finding from the firm's research was that simple physical changes, such as having larger tables in a cafeteria, facilitated more interaction and collaboration among colleagues than smaller tables. Another finding emphasized the importance of group breaks and office spaces which facilitate such breaks as having an important effect on employee morale and efficacy.
