= Black hat hacker =

Computer hacker with malicious intent

A black hat hacker is a hacker who disobeys laws or violates professional ethics for cybercrime, which can include piracy or identity theft. A black hat can also be referred to as a "cracker".

The term originates from 1950s westerns, with "bad guys" (criminals) typically depicted as having worn black hats and "good guys" (heroes) wearing white ones. In the same way, black hat hacking is contrasted with the more law-abiding white hat approach to hacking. Additionally, there exists a third category, called grey hat hacking, characterized by individuals who hack, usually with good intentions but by illegal means.

== Description ==
Criminals who intentionally enter computer networks with malicious intent are known as "black hat hackers". They may distribute malware that steals data (particularly login credentials), financial information, or personal information (such as passwords or credit card numbers). This information is often sold on the dark web. Malware can also be used to hold computers hostage or destroy files. Some hackers may also modify or destroy data in addition to stealing it. While hacking has become an important tool for governments to gather intelligence, black hats tend to work alone or with organized crime groups for financial gain. Black hat hackers can be from novice script kiddies to professional cybercriminals with state support. These individuals may either work alone or belong to well-organized hacker groups with adequate technical skill and knowledge needed to hack even the most advanced systems and implement the use of sophisticated malware. As regards present-day hackers, the advanced forms of black hat attacks involve hacking for APT attacks including cyber espionage, IP piracy, and sabotage. For some hackers, cybercrime may be an addictive experience.

== History ==
Countries initially affected by the WannaCry ransomware attack

The WannaCry ransomware attack in May 2017 is an example of black hat hacking. Around 400,000 computers in 150 countries were infected within two weeks. The creation of decryption tools by security experts within days limited the extortion payments to approximately $120,000, or slightly more than 1% of the potential payout.

The notable data breaches typically published by major news services are the work of black hat hackers. In a data breach, hackers can steal the financial, personal, or digital information of customers, patients, and constituents. The hackers can then use this information to smear a business or government agency, sell it on the dark web, or extort money from businesses, government agencies, or individuals. The United States experienced a record number of 1,862 data breaches in 2021, according to the Identity Theft Resource Center's 2021 Data Breach Report. There has been a noticeable increase in the number of data leaks. Take the United States as an example: in 2017, there were a record 1,506 incidents; in 2021, there was a new high of 1,862 incidents; and in 2023, there was a record 3,205 incidents. At the same time, there has been no significant decline between the peak values.

From 2013 to 2014, black hat hackers broke into Yahoo and stole 3 billion customer records, making it possibly the largest data breach ever. In addition, the adult website Adult FriendFinder was hacked in October 2016, and over 412 million customer records were taken. A data breach that occurred between May and July 2017 exposed more than 145 million customer records, making the national credit bureau Equifax another victim of black hat hacking.

== See also ==
- List of cybercriminals
