= Launch Complex 5 =

Launch Complex 5 may refer to:

- Cape Canaveral Air Force Station Launch Complex 5, a site used for various Redstone and Jupiter launches
- Vandenberg AFB Space Launch Complex 5, a launch pad at Vandenberg Air Force Base
- Pad 5 at Baikonur Cosmodrome Site 1, an active R-7 (Soyuz) launch pad at Baikonur
- Site 5 at the Svobodny Cosmodrome
- Woomera Launch Area 5
