= L0pht =

American hacker collective

L0pht Heavy Industries
- LHI Logo
- Formation: 1992
- Dissolved: 2000
- Purpose: Hacker think tank
- Location: United States
- Origin: Boston, Massachusetts
- Founders: Count Zero; White Knight; Brian Oblivion; Golgo 13
- Products: L0phtCrack
- Affiliations: Cult of the Dead Cow
- Website: l0pht.com at the Wayback Machine (archived 1999-02-19)

L0pht Heavy Industries (pronounced "loft") was a hacker group active between 1992 and 2000 and located in the Boston, Massachusetts area. The L0pht was one of the first viable hackerspaces in the US, and a pioneer of responsible disclosure. The group famously testified in front of Congress in 1998 on the topic of ‘Weak Computer Security in Government’.

== Name ==
The second character in its name was originally a slashed zero, a variant zero glyph used to distinguish the digit zero from the Latin script letter O, used by old teletypewriters and some character mode operating systems. Its modern online name, including its domain name, is therefore "l0pht" (with a zero, not a letter O or Ø).

== History ==
The origin of the L0pht can be traced to Brian Oblivion and Count Zero, two of the founding members, sharing a common loft space in South End, Boston, with their wives (Mary and Alicia) who ran a hat business in one half of the space and helped to establish an IRL communal work space. There they experimented with their own personal computers, equipment purchased from the MIT Radio Society Flea at MIT, and items obtained from dumpster diving local places of interest.

Founded in 1992 the L0pht quickly became a location for its members to store their computer hardware and work on various projects. In time, the members of L0pht quit their day jobs to start a business venture named L0pht Heavy Industries, a hacker think tank. The business released numerous security advisories. They also produced widely used software tools such as L0phtCrack, a password cracker for Windows NT, a POCSAG decoder, and CD software collections.

In 1997, on August 8–10, Mudge, Brian Oblivion, Kingpin, Space Rogue, Stefan, Weld Pond, and John Tan of L0pht discussed recent projects and accomplishments, Windows NT, new projects, emerging trends and shortcomings in technologies, with Q&A session at Beyond HOPE at the Puck Building in New York City.

In October 1999 L0pht was featured in a lengthy article in the New York Times Sunday Magazine. In the article Jeffrey Hunker, NSC's then Director of Information Protection, said about L0pht, "Their objective is basically to help improve the state of the art in security and to be a gadfly, so to speak."

In January 2000, L0pht Heavy Industries merged with the startup @stake, completing the L0pht's slow transition from an underground organization into a "whitehat" computer security company. Symantec announced its acquisition of @stake on September 16, 2004, and completed the transaction on October 8 of that year.

In March 2006, Weld Pond and Dildog founded application security company Veracode as a spin out from Symantec. The Veracode static binary analysis technology was built at @stake, based on prototypes and ideas incubated at the L0pht.

On March 14, 2008, several members of L0pht sat at a panel at a standing-room-only group of infosec professionals at SOURCE:Boston. Present were Weld Pond, John Tan, Mudge, Space Rogue, Silicosis and Dildog.

== Senate testimony ==
On May 19, 1998, all seven members of L0pht (Brian Oblivion, Kingpin, Mudge, Space Rogue, Stefan Von Neumann, John Tan, Weld Pond) famously testified before the Congress of the United States that they could shut down the entire Internet in 30 minutes. The Washington Post referred to the response as "a tragedy of missed opportunity".

Four members of the original group Space Rogue, Weld Pond, Kingpin and Mudge held a briefing entitled "“A Disaster Foretold — And Ignored” Revisiting the First-Ever Congressional Cybersecurity Hearing" hosted by the Congressional Internet Caucus Academy. The briefing, held on May 22, 2018, was almost exactly 20 years after the original testimony and was streamed live via Facebook.

At the Defcon 26 hacking conference, held on August 10, 2018 in Las Vegas, seven of the L0pht members sat on a panel entitled "The L0pht Testimony, 20 Years Later (and Other Things You Were Afraid to Ask)". Among other things the panel encouraged attendees to keep on hacking but stay on the side of the law that kept them out of jail.

The General Counsel of the National Security Agency, Glenn S. Gerstell quoted testimony from the L0pht’s hearing during his keynote to American Bar Association’s 28th Annual Review of the Field of National Security Law Conference on November 1, 2018.

== Products ==
As L0pht occupied a physical space, it had real expenses such as electricity, phone, Internet access, and rent. Early in the L0pht's history these costs were evenly divided among L0pht members. In fact, L0pht originally shared a space with a hat-making business run by the spouses of Brian Oblivion and Count Zero, and the rental cost was divided amongst them both. This was soon subsidized by profits made from selling old hardware at the monthly MIT electronic flea market during the summer.

Occasionally, shell accounts were offered for low cost on the L0pht.com server to selected individuals; while these individuals had access to the L0pht.com server they were not members of L0pht. One of the first physical products sold for profit by L0pht was a POCSAG decoder kit, which was sold in both kit and assembled form. Subsequently, the Whacked Mac Archives were transferred to CD-ROM for sale, soon followed by CD copies of the Black Crawling System Archives. The command line version of L0phtCrack, the password cracker for Windows NT, was given away free, but the GUI version was sold as a commercial product. This was followed by the creation of the Hacker News Network website to host advertisements. However, even with these sources of income, L0pht barely broke even, and eventually began doing custom security coding for companies like NFR.

In January 2009, L0phtCrack was acquired by the original authors Zatko, Wysopal, and Rioux from Symantec. L0phtCrack 6 was released at the SOURCE Boston Conference on March 11, 2009. L0phtCrack 6 contains support for 64-bit Windows platforms as well as upgraded rainbow tables support. On April 21, 2020 Terahash announced it had acquired L0phtCrack, details of the sale were not released. As of July 1, 2021, the L0phtCrack software is no longer owned by Terahash, LLC. It has been repossessed by the previous owners, formerly known as L0pht Holdings, LLC for Terahash defaulting on the installment sale loan. L0phtCrack has now been released as open source. Space Rogue had also published a book on February 24, 2023.

== Members ==
L0pht membership varied but included at various times:

- Brian Oblivion (Brian Hassick)
- Count Zero (John Lester)
- Dildog (Christien Rioux)
- Kingpin (Joe Grand)
- Silicosis (Paul Nash)
- Space Rogue (Cris Thomas)
- Stefan (Stefan Wuensch)
- Weld Pond (Chris Wysopal)
- Mudge (Peiter Zatko) - later became a program manager at DARPA and worked for Google
- tan (John Tan)
