= Joe Grand =

American electrical engineer (born 1975)

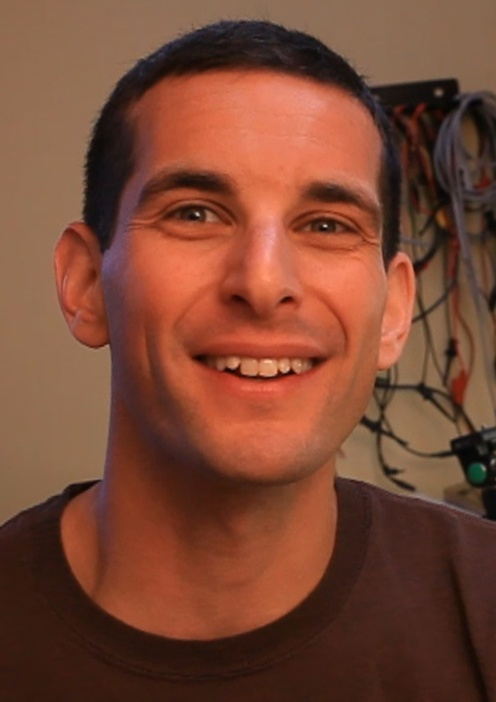
- Grand in 2012
- Born: September 3, 1975; Boston, Massachusetts, U.S.

Joe Grand is an American electrical engineer, inventor and hardware hacker known in the hacker community as Kingpin. He achieved mainstream popularity after his appearance on Prototype This!, a Discovery Channel television show. He specializes in reverse engineering and finding security flaws in hardware devices. Grand has testified before the U.S. Senate Committee on Governmental Affairs regarding government and homeland computer security under his internet handle, Kingpin.

== Early life and education ==
Grand became involved in electronics at the age of seven and later joined the Boston-based hacker group L0pht Heavy Industries. He gained a Bachelor of Science in Computer Engineering from Boston University. He has published two books and co-authored a number of books relating to hardware hacks and network security.

He received an honorary Doctorate of Science in Technology from the University of Advancing Technology, Arizona.

== Television ==
In 2007 and 2008, Grand and his three co-presenters (Mike North, Terry Sandin, and "Zoz" Brooks) filmed 13 episodes of Prototype This! which were aired later in 2008 and in early 2009. The show received positive reviews and ratings and Grand continues to host additional features and content on his site.

== Business ventures ==
After his television appearance, Grand launched Grand Idea Studio, a San Francisco-based research and development firm. In 2009, Grand was a member of a team that demonstrated vulnerabilities in San Francisco's e-parking meters. He is also the sole proprietor of Kingpin Empire, an apparel project that gives back to the community through charitable donations.

Other activities include exhibiting hardware as art in a San Francisco gallery art exhibition titled When Electronics Become Art and designing the electronic badges for DEFCON 2006, 2007, 2008, 2009, and 2010. Grand also served as judge of the Electronic Frontier Foundation's DEFCON badge hack contest, and as an instructor at DEFCON Kids.

Grand remains an active member of the electronics engineering and security communities and is a regular guest speaker at international events, including the Black Hat USA conferences.

In 2022 Grand used his hacking skills to recover 2 million dollars' worth of Bitcoin from a Trezor hardware wallet for the owner who had lost their PIN. In 2024 Grand recovered 3 million dollars' worth of Bitcoin for another person who had forgotten their password by exploiting a flaw in the RoboForm password manager.
