= Political positions of Susan Collins =

Full coverage of the policies of a US senator

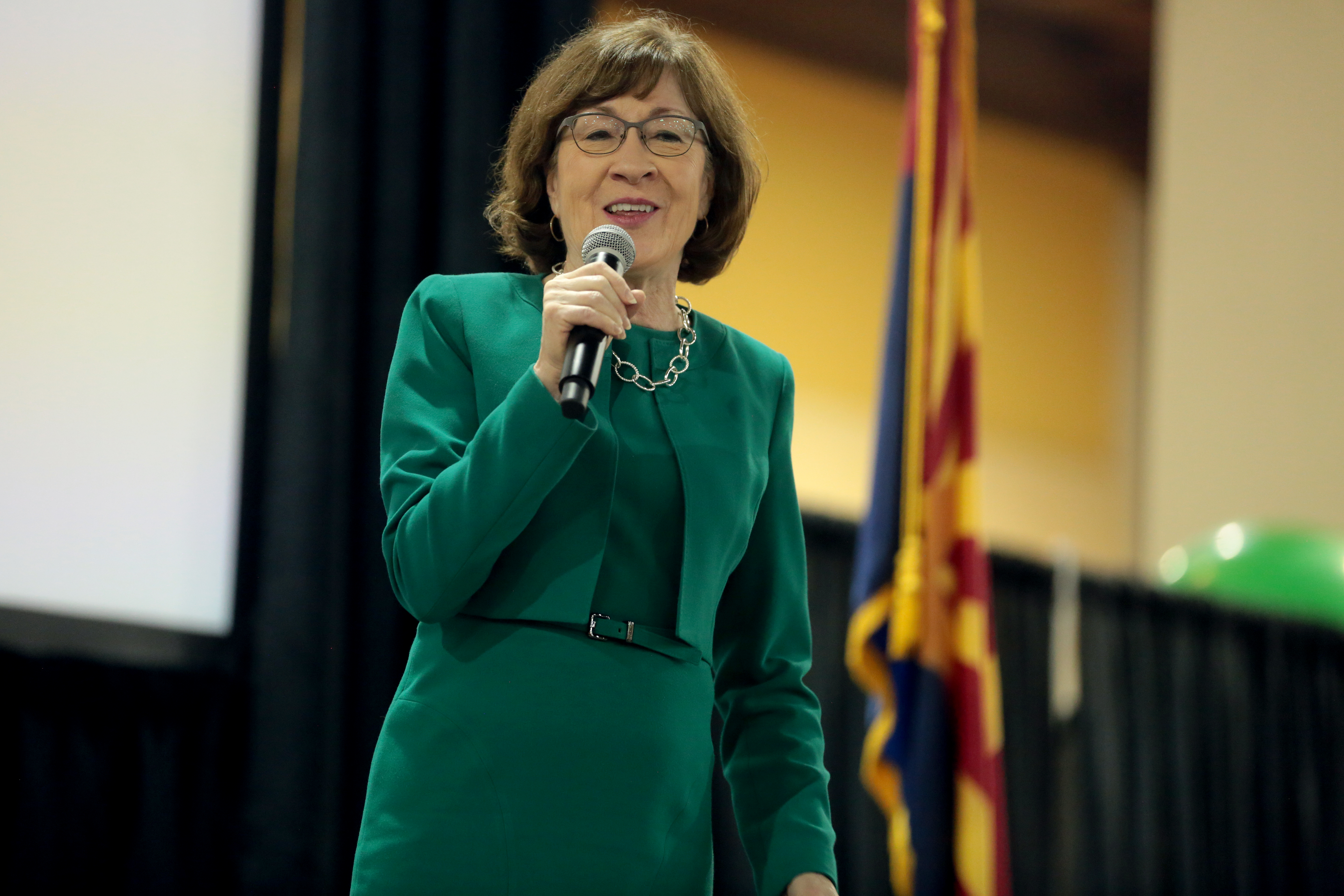
Collins speaking with attendees at the 2018 Small Business Expo at the Phoenix Convention Center in Phoenix, Arizona

The political positions of Susan Collins were reflected by her United States Senate voting record, public speeches, and interviews. Susan Collins is a Republican senator from Maine who has served since 1997. Collins is a self-described "moderate Republican". She has occasionally been referred to as a "liberal Republican" relative to her colleagues. In 2013, the National Journal gave Collins a score of 55% conservative and 45% liberal.

The New York Times arranged Republican Senators in 2017 based on ideology and ranked Senator Collins as the most liberal Republican. According to GovTrack, Senator Collins is the most moderate Republican in the Senate; GovTrack's analysis places her to the left of every Republican and four Democrats in 2017. Another website, OnTheIssues.org, labels Collins a "Moderate Libertarian Liberal". It also gives politicians a "social score" and an "economic score". Her social score is 60%, with 0% being the most conservative and 100% being the most liberal. Additionally, Collins's economic score is 53%, with 0% being the most liberal and 100% being the most conservative. The American Conservative Union (ACU) gives her a lifetime rating of 46.03% conservative. In 2016, they gave Collins a score of 23%. The Americans for Democratic Action gives her a rating of 45% liberal. In 2015, the ADA gave her a score of 30%.

According to CQ Roll Call, Collins sided with President Obama's position 75.9% of the time in 2013, one of only two Republicans to vote with him more than 70% of the time. FiveThirtyEight, which tracks Congressional votes, found that Collins voted with President Trump's positions about 67% of the time as of November, 2020. Nonetheless, she voted with the GOP majority on party-line votes with much greater frequency during the Trump presidency than during the Obama presidency. During the Biden presidency, as of February 2022, FiveThirtyEight found that she voted with Biden's positions approximately 75.6% of the time.

== Bipartisanship and moderate Republicanism ==
Susan Collins was considered by some groups and organizations to be a relatively bipartisan member of Congress. In 2018, Collins was considered the most bipartisan senator for the fifth consecutive year by the Lugar Center, an organization founded by former Republican Senate colleague Richard Lugar. A study published by Congressional Quarterly found that Collins voted with her party on party-line votes 59% of the time between 1997 and 2016; currently, she was the Republican senator most likely to vote with Democrats. Her perceived bipartisanship was largely due to her roots as a Northeastern Republican. With regard to judicial nominees, however, Collins voted with the GOP majority nearly 99% of the time over the last 22 years. However, she also voted to confirm Democratic Supreme Court nominees, Sonia Sotomayor and Elena Kagan. Her office also noted that she voted to confirm both Democratic and Republican judicial nominees 90% of the time during her tenure.

In 2014, her Senate colleague, Angus King, an Independent who caucuses with the Democratic Party, endorsed her for her re-election campaign. In 2019, Democratic Senator Joe Manchin endorsed Susan Collins for her 2020 re-election bid. She was also endorsed in 2020 by former Independent Senator, and 2000 Democratic vice-presidential nominee, Joe Lieberman. This bipartisanship and centrism has attracted some criticism from the conservative faction of the GOP. The conservative magazine, Human Events, considered her to be one of the top ten RINOs, or what they label insufficiently conservative, in 2005. Her highest conservative composite score from the National Journal was a 62% in 2009, while her highest liberal composite score was a 52.8% in 2006. The Tea Party threatened to challenge Collins over some of her votes. Collins "who is fiscally conservative but holds socially moderate views, plays a unique role in the current Republican drama at a time when a strong Tea Party faction has pushed the GOP — and its leadership — to the right." She was the subject of negative criticism from movement conservatives for her vote against repealing Obamacare.

=== Donald Trump ===
On August 8, 2016, Collins announced that she would not be voting for Donald Trump, the Republican nominee for the 2016 election. She said that as a lifelong Republican she did not make the decision lightly but felt that he was unsuitable for office, "based on his disregard for the precept of treating others with respect, an idea that should transcend politics." She considered voting for the Libertarian Party's ticket or a write-in candidate. During the Trump presidency, Collins voted with the GOP majority with much greater frequency (87% of the time on party-line votes in 2017).

Collins endorsed Nikki Haley over front-runner and former President Donald Trump in the 2024 Republican presidential primaries. On July 12, 2024, just three days before the Republican National Convention, Collins announced that she would not be voting for either nominee in the 2024 election and would instead write in Nikki Haley.

==== Firing of FBI Director James Comey ====
Collins supported Trump's decision to fire FBI Director James Comey.

==== Travel ban ====
On January 28, 2017, Collins joined five other Republicans to oppose President Donald Trump's temporary ban on immigration from seven Muslim-majority countries saying it was "overly broad and implementing it will be immediately problematic." She said, for example, that "it could interfere with the immigration of Iraqis who worked for American forces in Iraq as translators and bodyguards — people who literally saved the lives of our troops and diplomats during the last decade and whose lives are at risk if they remain in Iraq." She also objected to the religious aspects of the ban, saying, "As I stated last summer, religious tests serve no useful purpose in the immigration process and run contrary to our American values."

==== Investigations ====
Collins stated in February 2017 that she was open to subpoena President Trump's tax returns as part of an investigation into Russian interference in the 2016 presidential election. She also said that she was open to public and secret hearings into Michael T. Flynn's covert communications with Russian officials.

In July 2017, after President Trump said it would be a violation for Special Counsel Robert Mueller to investigate the finances of both him and his family not related to the probe, Collins commented, "I understand how difficult and frustrating this investigation is for the president, but he should not say anything further about the special counsel, his staff or the investigation."

In October 2017, Collins stated her support for the Senate Intelligence Committee calling back Hillary Clinton campaign chairman John Podesta and former Democratic National Committee chairwoman Debbie Wasserman Schultz after it was revealed that the Clinton campaign and the DNC paid for an opposition research dossier on Trump. Podesta and Schultz had earlier denied knowledge of any payment under the committee's questioning.

In a January 2018 interview, Collins stated her openness to legislation protecting Special Counsel Robert Mueller from being fired after reports surfaced that President Trump considered doing so the previous June, and she affirmed her confidence in United States Deputy Attorney General Rod Rosenstein: "It probably wouldn't hurt for us to pass one of those bills. There are some constitutional issues with those bills, but it certainly wouldn't hurt to put that extra safeguard in place given the latest stories, but again, I have faith in the deputy attorney general." She added that Rosenstein being fired would be a mistake and compared the scenario to that of the Saturday Night Massacre.

In November 2018, Collins expressed concern over comments made by Acting Attorney General of the United States Matthew Whitaker and supported the idea of the Senate bringing up "legislation that would put restrictions on the ability of President Donald Trump to fire the special counsel", stating that the bill being debated and passed in the Senate would "send a powerful message that Mr. Mueller must be able to complete his work unimpeded."

==== Impeachment inquiry ====
Senator Collins made several comments related to the impeachment inquiry against Donald Trump and the White House's statements regarding the inquiry. She emphasized multiple times that it would be inappropriate for her to come to any conclusions prior to evidence being presented in the Senate, due to her potential duty as a juror in such an event. When answering a question about the transcript of the July 25, 2019 telephone conversation between President Trump and Ukrainian president Volodymyr Zelenskyy where the resumption of a closed Ukrainian investigation into Hunter Biden was discussed, she said that it “raises a number of important questions.” She followed up this statement with the comment, “If there are articles of impeachment I would be a juror, and as a juror I think it’s inappropriate for me to reach conclusions about evidence or to comment on the proceedings in the House.”

On October 5, 2019, when reacting to Trump's comments about China becoming involved in investigating his political opponents Collins stated, “I thought the president made a big mistake by asking China to get involved in investigating a political opponent.” Collins went on to state, “It’s completely inappropriate.” Collins said she hoped the impeachment process would “be done with the seriousness that any impeachment proceeding deserves” and repeated the point about her being a juror in the event of an impeachment trial, “Should the articles of impeachment come to the Senate — and right now I’m going to guess that they will — I will be acting as a juror as I did in the Clinton impeachment trial.” During the same interview, Collins stated she was concerned that comments made by Representative Adam Schiff, chair of the House Intelligence Committee, “misrepresented and misled people about what was in the transcript in the call,” referring to the July 25, 2019 call between Trump and Ukrainian President Zelenskyy.

When reacting to comments made by Acting White House Chief of Staff Mick Mulvaney about the Trump administration's connecting the release of military aid to Ukraine and the resumption of an investigation into Hunter Biden Collins stated, "I was surprised that the president's chief of staff made that comment." She went on to state, "He then appeared to walk it back a few hours later. It shows why it's important to look at all the evidence in an objective way, and that's what I have pledged to do if articles of impeachment reach the Senate, which I suspect they will."

===== Senate trial =====
Senator Collins voted with her party on most initial motions with the 53-47 votes falling along party caucus lines. On January 22, 2020, Collins was the first Republican to break from the GOP, voting with Democrats on a motion to increase the time allotted for responses.

== Foreign policy and terrorism ==
On October 10, 2002, Collins voted with the majority in favor of the Iraq War Resolution authorizing President George W. Bush to go to war against Iraq. In November 2007, Collins was one of four Republicans to vote for a Democratic proposal of $50 billion that would condition further spending on a timeline for withdrawing troops, mandating that a withdrawal begin 30 days after the bill was enacted as part of goal of removing all US troops in Iraq by December 15, 2008. The bill failed to get the 60 votes needed to overcome a filibuster. In April 2008, Collins and Democrats Ben Nelson and Evan Bayh met with President Bush's advisor on Iraq and Afghanistan Douglas Lute as the three senators expressed support for a prohibition on spending for major reconstruction projects, requiring Iraq to pay for its security forces to be trained and equipped and to reimburse the American military for the estimated $153 million a month the military spent on fueling in combat operations in Iraq. Collins stated after the meeting that while the administration's view was not entirely similar to that of the senators, they at least seemed open to it. In June 2014, while growing violence erupted in Iraq under the leadership of Prime Minister Nouri al-Maliki, Collins stated that the violence would have been slower had a residual NATO force been present in Iraq and that the question was whether air strikes were effective.

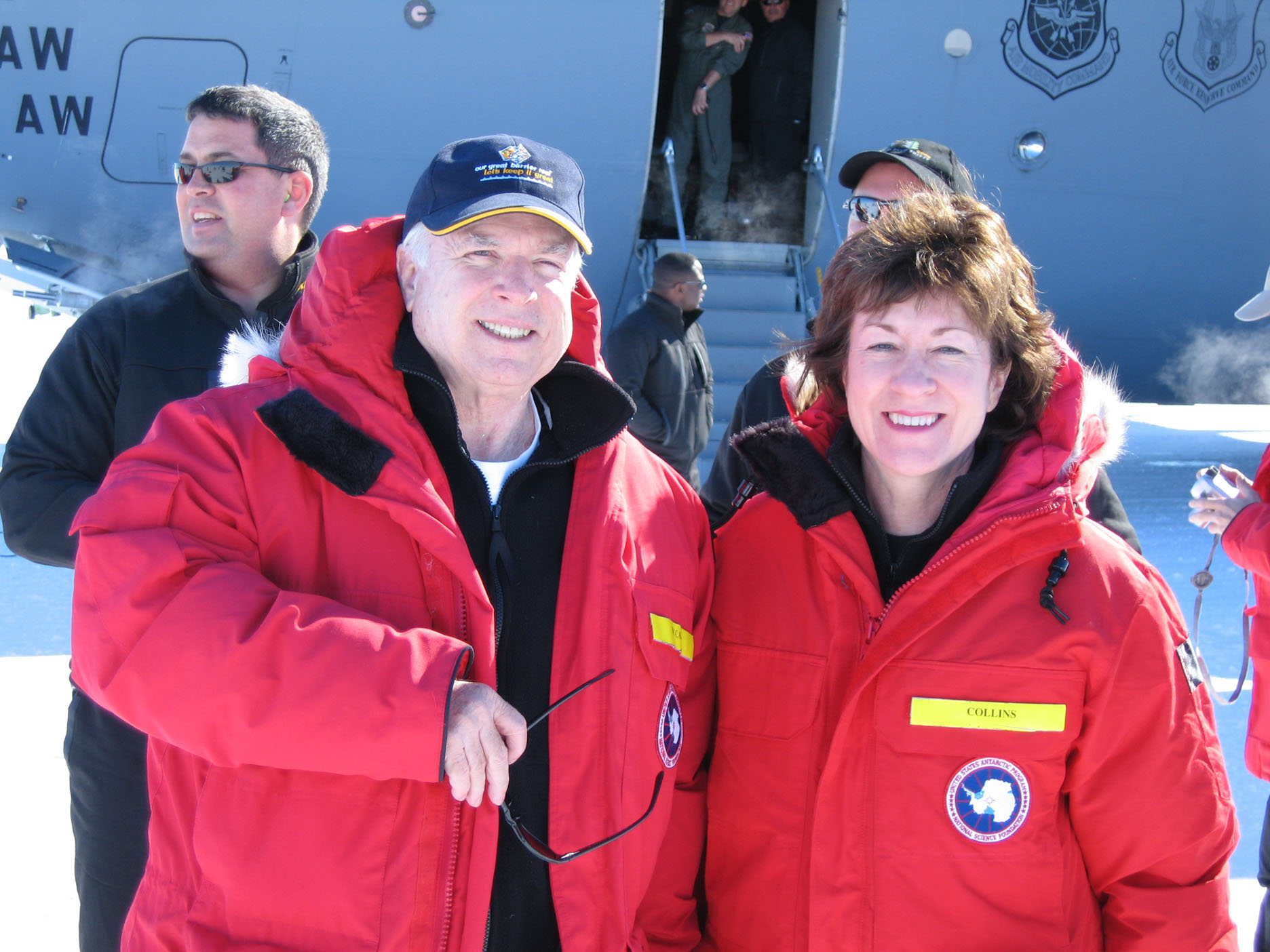
Collins and John McCain in Antarctica, 2006

On September 19, 2007, she voted against a motion to invoke cloture on Senator Arlen Specter's amendment proposing to restore habeas corpus for those detained by the United States.

Collins, joining the Senate majority, voted in favor of the Protect America Act, an amendment to the Foreign Intelligence Surveillance Act of 1978. She later sponsored the Accountability in Government Contracting Act of 2007, approved unanimously by the Senate, which would create more competition between military contractors.

Agreeing with the majority in both parties, Collins voted in favor of the Kyl-Lieberman Amendment, which gave President Bush and the executive branch the authorization for military force against Iran.

In January 2010, Collins was one of six senators to sign a letter to the Justice Department expressing concern "about using the U.S. criminal justice system for trying enemy combatants" and urged a reconsideration of the "decision to try Khalid Sheikh Mohammed and the other alleged conspirators in the September 11, 2001 attacks in the United States District Court for the Southern District of New York." The senators cited the September 11 attacks as an act of war with the perpetrators being "war criminals".

In December 2010, Collins voted for the ratification of New START, a nuclear arms reduction treaty between the United States and Russian Federation obliging both countries to have no more than 1,550 strategic warheads as well as 700 launchers deployed during the next seven years along with providing a continuation of on-site inspections that halted when START I expired the previous year. It was the first arms treaty with Russia in eight years.

In September 2014, Collins voted for President Obama's plan to train and arm moderate Syrian rebels to battle the Islamic State as part of the administration's military campaign to destroy the latter group while noting that she believed she was not given enough information in accordance with her position as a member of the Senate Intelligence Committee and expressed concern "that the fighters that we train will be focused on what really motivates them, which is removing (Syrian President Bashar al-) Assad, not fighting ISIS."

In September 2016, in advance of a UN Security Council resolution 2334 condemning Israeli settlements in the occupied Palestinian territories, Collins signed an AIPAC-sponsored letter urging President Barack Obama to veto "one-sided" resolutions against Israel. In 2017, Collins supported an Anti-Boycott Act, which would make it legal for U.S. states to refuse to do business with contractors that engage in boycotts against Israel. On August 15, 2019, after the Israeli government announced Representatives Ilhan Omar and Rashida Tlaib were barred from entering Israel, Collins tweeted that the Trump administration made "a mistake in urging Israel to prevent them from entering the country" and instead "should have encouraged Israel to welcome the visit as an opportunity for Reps. Tlaib and Omar to learn from the Israeli people."

In August 2017, after President Trump threatened that North Korea would be "met with fire and fury like the world has never seen" if it continued threatening the United States, Collins said in a statement, "Given the credible and serious threat North Korea poses to our country, and in particular to U.S. forces and our allies in the region, I welcome the administration's success in securing new economic sanctions against North Korea at the United Nations." In July 2018, Collins said a Washington Post report that found North Korea allegedly not willing to denuclearize was troubling, citing North Korea's "long history of cheating on agreements that it's made with previous administrations." She said that her support for Trump's communicating with North Korean leader Kim Jong-un was "because I do believe that has the potential for increasing our safety and eventually leading to the denuclearization of North Korea" and added that this could be achieved through "verifiable, unimpeded, reliable inspections."

In January 2018, in response to the Trump administration not implementing congressionally approved sanctions on Russia, Collins stated that it was confirmed that Russia had tried to interfere in the 2016 U.S. presidential election, adding that "not only should there be a price to pay in terms of sanctions, but also we need to put safeguards in place right now for the elections for this year." She noted that the legislation received bipartisan support and predicted that Russia would also attempt to interfere in the 2018 elections.

In May 2018, Collins and fellow Maine senator Angus King introduced the PRINT Act, a bill that if enacted would halt collections of countervailing duties and antidumping duties on Canadian newsprint and would direct the U.S. Department of Commerce to conduct a study of the economic health of the printing and publishing industries. Proponents of the bill argued it would offer a lifeline to the publishing industry amid newsprint price increases, while critics accused it of setting "a dangerous precedent for future investigations into allegations of unfair trade practices."

In January 2019, Collins was one of eleven Republican senators to vote to advance legislation to block President Trump's intent to lift sanctions against three Russian companies. Collins told reporters that she disagreed with "the easing of the sanctions because I think it sends the wrong message to Russia and to the oligarch and close ally of Mr. Putin, Oleg Deripaska, who will in my judgement continue to maintain considerable [ownership] under the Treasury's plan."

In January 2019, Collins was one of eight senators to reintroduce legislation to prevent President Trump from withdrawing the United States from NATO by imposing a requirement of a two-thirds approval from the Senate for a president to suspend, terminate, or withdraw American involvement with the international organization, following a report that President Trump had expressed interest in withdrawing from NATO several times during the previous year.

In 2019, after President Trump cut aid to Honduras, Guatemala, and El Salvador as part of an effort to curb immigration to the United States from those countries, Collins opined "that cutting aid may have the opposite effect" and could possibly "make the lives of these individuals even worse and thus encourage more of them to flee the countries that they are now leaving. So I'd actually like to see the president consider a different approach, an opposite approach." She added that increasing aid could "help the countries stem some of the problems that are causing people to leave."

=== Afghanistan ===
In September 2009, Collins stated that she was unsure if adding more American troops in Afghanistan was the solution to ending the conflict, but cited the need for "more American civilians to help build up institutions" and growth of the Afghan army. She opined that the US was "dealing with widespread corruption, a very difficult terrain, and I'm just wondering where this ends and how we'll know when we've succeeded."

In October 2010, along with Chuck Grassley, Tom Coburn, and Claire McCaskill, Collins was one of four senators to send a letter to President Obama requesting he remove Arnold Field from the latter's position as Special Inspector General for Afghanistan Reconstruction, citing their repeated expressions of concern for the SIGAR and their disappointment with the Obama administration's "ongoing failure to take decisive action."

In August 2017, following a national speech by President Trump on the war in Afghanistan in which he announced an increase in troops there and that he would prioritize partnerships between the US, Pakistan and India, Collins commended Trump for providing clarity after years of the US lacking a "clear focus and defined strategy" with respect to Afghanistan, and said that he made the case for the Afghanistan government needing to participate "in defending its people, ending havens for terrorists, and curtailing corruption." Collins confirmed she had spoken to Homeland Security Advisor Tom Bossert.

=== China ===
Ahead of President Obama and President of China Xi Jinping holding a meeting at an informal retreat in June 2013, Collins cosponsored legislation that would expand American law to authorize the Commerce Department to impose "countervailing duties" in response to subsidized imports through mandating a Commerce Department investigation to determine if currency manipulation counted as a form of subsidy. The bill also contained a provision mandating that the Treasury Department designate countries with "fundamentally misaligned currencies" and was sponsored at a time of a recent rise in the Chinese currency to the highest level since 2005.

Following reports of China-based hackers breaking into the computer networks of the U.S. government personnel office and stealing information identifying at least 4 million federal workers in June 2015, Collins commented that the hacking was "yet another indication of a foreign power probing successfully and focusing on what appears to be data that would identify people with security clearances."

In April 2018, Collins stated her belief that the US needed "a more nuanced approach" in dealing with China but gave President Trump "credit for levying these tariffs against the Chinese, with whom we've talked for a decade about their unfair trade practices and their theft of intellectual property from American firms." She added that while the US needed to toughen its stance against China, it would need to do this in a manner that did not create "a trade war and retaliation that will end up with our European and Asian competitors getting business that otherwise would have come to American farmers."

In June 2018, Collins cosponsored a bipartisan bill to reinstate penalties on ZTE for export control violations and to bar American government agencies from either purchasing or leasing equipment or services from ZTE or Huawei. The bill was offered as an amendment to the National Defense Authorization Act and was in direct contrast to the Trump administration's announced intent to ease sanctions on ZTE.

In January 2019, Collins was a cosponsor of legislation unveiled by Marco Rubio and Mark Warner to "combat tech-specific threats to national security posed by foreign actors like China and ensure U.S. technological supremacy by improving interagency coordination across the U.S. government" through the formation of a White House Office of Critical Technologies and Security. The proposed office would be responsible for coordinating across agencies and developing a long-term strategy across the entire government with the aim of protecting "against state-sponsored technology theft and risks to critical supply chains."

In February 2019, amid a report by the Commerce Department that ZTE had been caught illegally shipping goods of American origin to Iran and North Korea, Collins was one of seven senators to sponsor a bill reimposing sanctions on ZTE in the event that ZTE did not honor both American laws and its agreement with the Trump administration.

In February 2019, Collins signed a letter to President Trump noting that China "has not opened their market to fresh potatoes from the United States and has left U.S. potato growers without a clear path forward on how to resolve concerns that are standing in the way of opening this important market" and requesting that the administration treat the issue with high priority in its talks with China regarding a trade deal.

In February 2019, during ongoing disputes between the United States and China on trade, Collins was one of ten senators to sign a bipartisan letter to Homeland Security Secretary Kirstjen Nielsen and Energy Secretary Rick Perry asserting that the American government "should consider a ban on the use of Huawei inverters in the United States and work with state and local regulators to raise awareness and mitigate potential threats" and urged them "to work with all federal, state and local regulators, as well as the hundreds of independent power producers and electricity distributors nation-wide to ensure our systems are protected."

On July 15, 2019, Collins introduced the Huawei Prohibition Act of 2019 with Utah Senator Mitt Romney, a bill that prevented companies on the U.S. Commerce Department's Entity List of sanctioned companies until it was certified to Congress that neither Huawei nor any senior officers of the company in question had previously engaged in actions violating sanctions imposed by the United States or the United Nations in the five years preceding the certification. Collins was also part of a group of senators that signed a July 17 letter to Senate leadership requesting that Chairman Jim Inhofe and ranking member of the U.S. Senate Armed Services Committee Jack Reed include a provision in the final National Defense Authorization Act for Fiscal Year 2020 that was similar to the Collins-Romney bill, calling it "imperative that Congress address known threats to the security of technology in the United States" before identifying Huawei as one and asserting that "Huawei must meet strict standards to assure it is no longer a national security threat before being removed from the entities list."

=== Cuba ===
In 2016, Collins authorized a provision to allow aircraft traveling to or returning from Cuba in the transatlantic route the authority to make stops in the US for refueling at the Bangor, Maine airport. The provision was approved as part of an amendment to a spending bill and earned objection from the Treasury Department who sent a concerned message asserting that the provision's language could be used by airlines or countries not allowed to fly in the US to land planes on American soil.

In May 2019, Collins was one of thirteen senators to support a bipartisan proposal to remove restrictions on private financing for exports in order to remove a barrier for farmers interested in selling products to Cuba. Collins and Angus King said in a statement that the intended effects of the proposal were about leveling "the playing field for American farmers to open up a significant new export opportunity."

=== Defense ===
In August 2019, Collins was one of eight senators to sign a letter led by Marco Rubio and Pat Toomey to U.S. Defense Secretary Mark Esper calling for an expansion of the F-35 program in response to the Trump administration ejecting Turkey from the group of F-35 partner nations.

=== Iran ===
Collins was one of seven Senate Republicans who did not sign a March 2015 letter to the leadership of the Islamic Republic of Iran attempting to cast doubt on the Obama administration's authority to engage in nuclear-proliferation negotiations with Iran. In reference to the letter, Collins told reporters, "I don't think that the ayatollah is going to be particularly convinced by a letter from members of the Senate, even one signed by a number of my distinguished and high-ranking colleagues." A deal between the United States and other world powers with the stated aim of keeping Iran from being able to produce an atomic weapon for at least 10 years was announced in July 2015. Collins was reluctant to evaluate the effectiveness of the agreement as described: "A verifiable diplomatic agreement that prevents Iran’s pursuit of nuclear weapons and dismantles its nuclear infrastructure is the desired outcome; however, it is far from clear that this agreement will accomplish those goals." In September 2015, Collins announced her opposition to the Joint Comprehensive Plan of Action in a Senate floor speech, stating that the agreement was "fundamentally flawed because it leaves Iran as capable of building a nuclear weapon at the expiration of the agreement as it is today" and predicted that following the agreement's expiration, Iran "will be a more dangerous and stronger nuclear threshold state – exactly the opposite of what this negotiation should have produced."

In September 2016, Collins was one of 34 senators to sign a letter to United States Secretary of State John Kerry advocating for the United States using "all available tools to dissuade Russia from continuing its airstrikes in Syria" from an Iranian airbase near Hamadan "that are clearly not in our interest" and stating that there should be clear enforcement by the US of the airstrikes violating "a legally binding Security Council Resolution" on Iran.

In June 2017, Collins voted for legislation that imposed new sanctions on Russia targeting the country's mining, metals, shipping and railways in response to Russian meddling in the 2016 Presidential election and implemented new sanctions on Iran regarding its ballistic missile program as well as other activities that were not related to the Joint Comprehensive Plan of Action. In July 2017, Collins voted in favor of the Countering America's Adversaries Through Sanctions Act that placed sanctions on Iran together with Russia and North Korea.

In August 2018, after President Trump imposed sanctions on Iran while remaining "open to reaching a more comprehensive deal that addresses the full range of the regime's malign activities, including its ballistic missile program and its support for terrorism", Collins opined that it was likely unilateral sanctions would make Iran "less likely to come back to the negotiating table."

In June 2019, following President Trump's decision to halt an air strike on Iran planned as a response to an American surveillance drone being downed by Iran, Collins stated that the US could not "allow Iran to continue to launch this kind of attack" but warned miscalculations by either side "could lead to a war in the Middle East, and that is something I don’t think anyone wants to see happen."

=== Saudi Arabia and Yemen ===
In March 2018, Collins was one of five Republican senators to vote against tabling a resolution that would cease the U.S. military's support for Saudi Arabia's bombing operations in Yemen. In August, Collins was one of nine senators and two Republicans to sign a letter to Secretary of State Mike Pompeo urging the Trump administration to comply with a law requiring certification that Saudi Arabia and the United Arab Emirates were meeting a humanitarian criteria or else being removed from American military assistance. The letter implicated the ongoing Yemen civil war as posing a threat to American interests through its continuation. In October 2018, Collins was one of seven senators to sign a letter to Secretary of State Pompeo expressing that they found it "difficult to reconcile known facts with at least two" of the Trump administration's certifications that Saudi Arabia and the United Arab Emirates were attempting to protect Yemen civilians and were in compliance with US laws on arms sales, citing their lack of understanding for "a certification that the Saudi and Emirati governments are complying with applicable agreements and laws regulating defense articles when the [memo] explicitly states that, in certain instances, they have not done so." In December, Collins was one of seven Republican senators to vote for the resolution withdrawing American armed forces' support for the Saudi-led coalition in Yemen and an amendment by Todd Young ensuring mid-air refueling between American and Saudi Air Force did not resume.

In February 2019, Collins was one of seven senators to reintroduce legislation requiring sanctions on Saudi officials involved in the killing of Jamal Khashoggi and seeking to address support for the Yemen civil war through prohibiting some weapons sales to Saudi Arabia and U.S. military refueling of Saudi coalition planes. Collins was one of seven Republicans who voted to end US support for the war in Yemen in February 2019, and, in May 2019, she was again one of seven Republicans who voted to override Trump's veto of the resolution on Yemen. In June 2019, Collins was one of seven Republicans to vote to block President Trump's Saudi arms deal providing weapons to Saudi Arabia, United Arab Emirates and Jordan, and was one of five Republicans to vote against an additional 20 arms sales.

== Social issues ==
=== Abortion laws ===
Susan Collins voted to confirm Supreme Court Justice Brett Kavanaugh. The justice was confirmed 50-48, and without the crucial vote cast by Collins, would’ve needed a tie-breaking vote by Vice President Pence to be confirmed. At the time Senator Collins gave a floor speech explaining why she voted for the justice’s confirmation despite warnings from those opposing the justice’s confirmation that he would strike down Roe v. Wade. On May 2, 2022, Politico ran an exclusive article of the confirmed legitimate leaked opinion of the court where it was discovered Brett Kavanaugh had voted to overturn Roe v. Wade. On May 11, 2022, after the leaked opinion became public, Senator Collins voted against a bill to codify Roe v. Wade into federal law. The final opinion was issued on June 24, 2022.

Collins has described herself as a pro-choice Republican. The now-defunct Republican Majority for Choice, a pro-choice Republican PAC, supported Senator Collins. By July 2018, Collins was one of three Republican Senators, the others being Shelley Moore Capito and Lisa Murkowski who publicly supported the Roe v. Wade decision. In 2020, she was one of 13 GOP Senators who declined to sign an amicus brief asking the Supreme Court to overturn Roe v. Wade. She did, however, declare that she is opposed to repealing the Hyde Amendment which prohibits federal funding for abortions.

On October 21, 2003, with Senate Democrats, Collins was one of the three Republican Senators to oppose the Partial-Birth Abortion Ban Act. She did, however, join the majority of Republicans in voting for Laci and Conner's Law to increase penalties for killing the fetus while committing a violent crime against the mother. On March 30, 2017, Collins would again join Senator Lisa Murkowski to break party lines on a vote; this time against a bill allowing states to defund Planned Parenthood. As in that case, Vice President Pence was forced to break a 50–50 tie in favor of the bill. She was one of three Republicans, with Capito and Murkowski, who opposed a bill to repeal the Affordable Care Act (ACA) that included a provision to defund Planned Parenthood. She was one of seven Republicans, including Capito and Murkowski, who voted against a bill to repeal the ACA without replacement that would have also defunded Planned Parenthood. In 2018, Collins voted with the majority of Senate Democrats against a bill that would ban abortion after 20 weeks of pregnancy. She was also one of two Republicans who voted against an amendment to ban federal funds for facilities that provide abortion services and family planning. In 2019, Collins joined a majority of Republicans, and three Democrats, to vote for a bill that required doctors to provide care and medical intervention for infants born alive after a failed abortion. Also in 2019, she announced that she is opposed to laws that ban abortions even in cases of rape or incest, specifically stating that such laws are against national Supreme Court rulings. Planned Parenthood, which rates politicians' support for pro-choice issues, has given Collins a lifetime rating of 70%. In 2017, Planned Parenthood gave her a rating of 61%. Also in 2017, Planned Parenthood gave Collins an award given to Republicans who vote closely in line with their positions. NARAL Pro-Choice America, which also provides ratings, gave her a score of 90% in 2014 and a 45% in 2017. Conversely, National Right to Life, which opposes abortion and rates support for pro-life issues, gave Collins a rating of 25% during the 114th Congress and a 50% in 2019.

=== Age discrimination ===
In February 2019, along with Patrick Leahy, Bob Casey Jr., and Chuck Grassley, Collins was one of four senators to introduce the Protecting Older Workers Against Discrimination Act (POWADA), a bill that sought to undo the standards imposed by the 2009 U.S. Supreme Court ruling in Gross v. FBL Financial Services and restore the requirement that plaintiffs had to show only that age was a factor in their decision on employment as opposed to the deciding factor.

=== Agriculture ===
In September 2017, Collins was one of four senators to introduce the Cultivating Revitalization by Expanding American Agricultural Trade and Exports Act (CREAATE Act), legislation that would increase funding for both the Market Access Program (MAP) and the Foreign Market Development Program (FMDP) of the Agriculture Department. The National Corn Growers Association (NCGA) stated that the CREAATE Act would double annual MAP funding from $200 million to $400 million, and increase annual FMDP funding from $34.5 million to $69 million over a five-year period.

In November 2017, following an announcement of the Agriculture Department's National Institute of Food and Agriculture (NIFA) awarding a grant of $388,000 to the University of Maine at Orono, Collins and fellow Maine Senator Angus King said the funding would "support the University of Maine's cutting-edge research into potato breeding and help the state build on our strong agricultural traditions so we can make Maine potato products more economically resilient."

In February 2018, Collins and Democrat Bob Casey Jr. introduced the Organic Agriculture Research Act of 2018, a bill reauthorizing increased funding for the Organic Agriculture Research and Extension Initiative (OREI) of the USDA as part of an assurance of organic agricultural research having continued investment. The bill also reauthorized OREI for five more years and increased funding from $30 million in fiscal year 2019 to $50 million in fiscal year 2023. Collins commented that the legislation would "provide some funding for research into organic farming methods and help offset part of the cost that the state uses to certify farms as complying with USDA standards for organic farming."

In August 2018, Collins was one of 31 senators to vote against the Protect Interstate Commerce Act of 2018, a proposed amendment to the 2018 United States farm bill that would mandate states to authorize agricultural product sales not be prohibited under federal law. After the farm bill passed in December, Collins and Angus King released a statement expressing their delight at the amendment not being included, as there were a "number of state laws in Maine that would have been undermined if this amendment was adopted, including those on crate bans for livestock, consumer protections for blueberry inspections, and environmental safeguards for cranberry cultivation."

In 2019, Collins worked with Patrick Leahy, Sherrod Brown, and David Perdue on a bipartisan effort to ensure students had access to local foods and would also help both local farmers and childhood health. The proposal would assist the Farm to School Grant Program administered through the Agriculture Department and raise the program's authorized level from $5 million to $15 million in addition to increasing the maximum grant award to $250,000.

In March 2019, Collins was one of 38 senators to sign a letter to Secretary of Agriculture Sonny Perdue warning that dairy farmers "have continued to face market instability and are struggling to survive the fourth year of sustained low prices" and urging his department to "strongly encourage these farmers to consider the Dairy Margin Coverage program."

=== Cybersecurity ===
In February 2019, Collins and Senator Jack Reed introduced the Cybersecurity Disclosure Act of 2019, a bill that would require that publicly traded companies include information in their Securities and Exchange Commission disclosures for investors as to determine whether or not any member of the company's board of directors is a cybersecurity expert. Collins stated that cyberattacks had become more common and called on Congress to take action "to better protect Americans from hackers attempting to steal sensitive data and personal information." Collins also cited statistics from the Identity Theft Resource Center and Deloitte that demonstrated an increased numbers of cyberattacks across numerous industries in the United States and noting financial institutions that had named cybersecurity as one of the top three risks expected to rise in importance as it related to businesses over the course of the following two years. The bill was referred to for consideration to the Banking, Housing, and Urban Affairs Committee of the Senate.

=== Elections ===
On December 21, 2017, Collins was one of six senators to introduce the Secure Elections Act, legislation authorizing block grants for states that would update outdated voting technology and establish an independent panel of experts to work toward development of cybersecurity guidelines for election systems which states could choose to adopt, along with offering states resources to install the recommendations.

In October 2018 Collins cosponsored, together with Chris Van Hollen and Ben Cardin, a bipartisan bill that if passed would block "any persons from foreign adversaries from owning or having control over vendors administering U.S. elections." Protect Our Elections Act would make companies involved in administering elections reveal foreign owners and inform local, state, and federal authorities if said ownership changed. Companies failing to comply would face fines of $100,000.

In May 2019, Collins and Democrat Amy Klobuchar introduced the Invest in Our Democracy Act of 2019, which would direct the Election Assistance Commission to provide grants for continuing education in election administration or cybersecurity for both election officials and employees. Klobuchar stated that the bill "would ensure that election officials have the training and resources to improve cyber-defenses ahead of future elections."

=== Hate crimes ===
In April 2017, along with Kamala Harris, Dianne Feinstein, and Marco Rubio, Collins cosponsored a resolution condemning hate crimes related to ethnicity, religion, and race. The resolution's text cited incidents reflecting an increase in anti-Semitic hate crimes throughout the United States and incidents of Islamic centers and mosques being burned in Texas, Washington, and Florida and asked the federal government to cooperate with state and local officials to increase the speed of its investigations into hate crimes. In a statement, Collins said, "The recent rise in the number of hate crimes is truly troubling and is counter to American values. No individual in our society should have to live in fear of violence or experience discrimination."

=== LGBT issues ===
In 2004, Susan Collins was one of six Republicans who voted against the Federal Marriage Amendment which was an amendment intended to ban same-sex marriage. In June 2006, she voted against the Federal Marriage Amendment for a second time. Collins joined six other Republicans, including Olympia Snowe and John McCain, in voting against the effort to ban gay marriage.

On December 18, 2010, Collins voted for the Don't Ask, Don't Tell Repeal Act of 2010 and was the primary Republican sponsor of the repeal effort.

In May 2012, in their capacity as members of the Homeland Security and Governmental Affairs Committee, Collins and Joe Lieberman sponsored a bill intended to extend benefits to same-sex partners of American government workers and stated that the legislation was meant to make the government compete with the private sector for top employees along with provide assurance of fair treatment for those in same-sex relationships rather than address the issue of same-sex marriage. The bill cleared the committee on a voice vote.

In September 2013, Collins and Democrat Tammy Baldwin introduced the Domestic Partnership Benefits and Obligations Act of 2013, legislation that would extend employee benefit programs in order to provide coverage for federal employees' same-sex domestic partners to the same extent as those benefits used to cover married opposite-sex spouses of federal employees. Collins stated the bill being implemented would be "both fair policy and good business practice" and that the federal government "must compete with the private sector when it comes to attracting the most qualified, skilled, and dedicated employees."

Collins stated her support on same-sex marriage on June 25, 2014, after previously declining to publicly state her views, citing a policy to not discuss state-level issues, as well as a belief that each state's voters should decide the issue. When she won reelection in 2014, she became the first Republican senator to be reelected while supporting same-sex marriage.

Collins voted for the Employment Non-Discrimination Act to prevent job discrimination based on sexuality and gender identity. In 2015, she was one of 11 Republican Senators who voted to give social security benefits to same-sex couples in states where same-sex marriage was not yet recognized. The Human Rights Campaign, which rates politicians' support for LGBT issues, gave Collins a score of 85% during the 114th Congress. She received a 33% during the 115th Congress.

In 2017, Collins and New York Senator Kirsten Gillibrand "introduced a bipartisan amendment to protect transgender service members from President Trump's plan to ban them from the military." Collins and Gillibrand were joined by Jack Reed in reintroducing the legislation in February 2019, after the Supreme Court upheld the Trump administration's ban on transgender individuals serving in the military. In a statement, Collins said that "if individuals are willing to put on the uniform of our country and risk their lives for our freedoms, then we should be expressing our gratitude to them, not trying to kick them out of the military." In 2019, Collins co-sponsored legislation with Jeff Merkley (D-Oregon) to extend the Civil Rights Act of 1964 to people regardless of sexual orientation or gender identity. She later withdrew her co-sponsorship of that legislation. In May 2019, she also introduced legislation, co-sponsoring the bill with Angus King and Tim Kaine, to prohibit housing discrimination against LGBT people.

In February 2021, Collins voted to confirm Pete Buttigieg as the Secretary of Transportation, making him the first openly gay presidential cabinet member to have been confirmed by the Senate. After previously sponsoring the Equality Act, Collins announced that she would not co-sponsor the Equality Act in the 117th Congress. In March 2021, Collins voted in favor of a failed amendment to legislation that would have rescinded funds from public schools that allow trans youth to participate in the sporting teams of their gender identity, and this was seen as a departure from her past support for LGBT rights. Later in the month, she was one of two Republicans on the HELP Committee to vote in favor of advancing the nomination of Dr. Rachel Levine, a trans woman and physician, in a 13-9 vote. She was one of two Republicans who voted to confirm Dr. Levine in a vote of the full Senate.

=== Maternal mortality ===
In June 2019, Collins and Debbie Stabenow introduced legislation to grant funding for new community partnerships that would respond to the high rate of maternal and infant mortality in the US.

=== Opioids ===
In 2016, Collins authored the Safe Treatments and Opportunities to Prevent Pain Act, a provision intended to encourage the National Institutes of Health to further its research into opioid therapy alternatives in regard to pain management, and the Infant Plan of Safe Care Act, which mandated that states ensure safe care plans are developed for infants that are drug dependent before they are discharged from hospitals. These provisions were included in the Comprehensive Addiction and Recovery Act, legislation that created programs and expanded treatment access alongside implementing 181 million in new spending as part of an attempt to curb heroin and opioid addiction.

In May 2017, Collins was one of six senators to introduce the Medicaid Coverage for Addiction Recovery Expansion Act, legislation that would allow treatment facilities with up to 40 beds reimbursement by Medicaid for 60 consecutive days of inpatient services and serve as a modification of the Medicaid Institutions for Mental Disease law which only authorized Medicaid coverage for facilities with 16 beds or less. Every senator that introduced the bill said that their state had been impacted by opioid addiction and would benefit from the bill's passage.

In December 2017, Collins was one of nine senators to sign a letter to Senate Majority Leader Mitch McConnell and Senate Minority Leader Chuck Schumer describing opioid use as a non-partisan issue presently "ravaging communities in every state and preys upon individuals and families regardless of party affiliation" and requesting the pair "make every effort to ensure that new, substantial and sustained funding for the opioid epidemic is included in any legislative package."

In September 2018, Collins authored two bills as part of the "Opioid Crisis Response Act", a bipartisan package of 70 Senate bills that would alter programs across multiple agencies in an effort to prevent opioids from being shipped through the U.S. Postal Service and grant doctors the ability to prescribe medications designed to wean opioid addictions. The bills passed 99 to 1.

In April 2019, Collins cosponsored the Protecting Jessica Grubb's Legacy Act, legislation that authorized medical records of patients being treated for substance use disorder being shared among healthcare providers in the event that the patient provided the information. Cosponsor Shelley Moore Capito stated that the bill also prevented medical providers from unintentionally providing opioids to individuals in recovery.

=== Pharmaceutical drugs ===
In 2015, Collins recounted that drug manufactures had claimed their price increases were necessary for cost related to both research and development and that she happened to know "in the case of [the antimalarial drug] Daraprim, that it’s been around since the 1950s, and Turing [which owns Daraprim] was founded in 2015."

In 2016, Collins and Claire McCaskill signed a letter to Pfizer CEO Ian Read where they noted that drug overdoses were the leading cause of accidental death in the US and requested an explanation on "the number and amount of price increases and decreases taken by Hospira between 2009 and 2014 for naloxone" along with "how Hospira came to the decision to raise the price, as well as how much the increases contributed to research and development into improving the product, and whether any issues of patient access arose."

In January 2017, along with Chuck Grassley, Sherrod Brown, and Bob Casey Jr., Collins introduced the Pharmacy and Medically Underserved Areas Enhancement Act, a bill that would grant Medicare the ability to reimburse in regards to immunizations, preventive screenings, and chronic disease management and recognize pharmacists as healthcare providers in "medically underserved areas" through an amendment of title XVIII of the Social Security Act.

In December 2017, along with Amy Klobuchar and Tammy Baldwin, Collins was one of three senators to sign a letter to Strongbridge Biopharma CEO Matthew Pauls that stated their commitment "to combatting sudden astronomical price increases as well as any anticompetitive conduct and attempts to game the regulatory process at the expense of Americans in need of life-saving therapies." The senators requested the company alleviate the price increase on Keveyis and provide compliance to relevant laws and a written response related to their acquisition of dichlorphenamide.

In January 2019, Collins sent a letter to the Department of Health and Human Services citing a Wall Street Journal article that reported how over three dozen pharmaceutical companies raised the price of hundreds of drugs on New Year's Day and requested that the department take action in regards to a Trump administration pledge to alter drug rebates. Collins wrote that the price increases were "shocking, but they are unfortunately not unusual, nor are they unexpected" and of the potential necessity of legislation to reform the drug rebates system.

In February 2019, Collins was a cosponsor of the Creating and Restoring Equal Access To Equivalent Samples (CREATES) Act of 2019, a bipartisan bill preventing brand-name pharmaceutical and biologic companies from stifling competition through blockage of the entry of lower-cost generic drugs into the market. The CREATES Act was placed on the U.S. Senate Legislative Calendar under General Orders.

In June 2019, when Collins and other members of the Problem Solvers Caucus announced guiding principles as a framework for legislation related to lowering the costs of prescription drugs, she said in part, "I look forward to working with our partners in the House to pass legislation to help Americans facing exorbitant costs for the medications they need, particularly seniors, 90 percent of whom take a prescription drug."

In July 2019, along with Jeanne Shaheen, Tom Carper, and Kevin Cramer, Collins was one of four senators to cosponsor the Insulin Price Reduction Act, a bill that would prohibit insurers and pharmacy benefit managers (PBM's) from engaging in schemes with insulin manufacturers that would bring 2020 list prices in line with level from 2006 and mandate that price hikes would not exceed medical inflation in that year.

=== Robocalls ===
In July 2019, Collins introduced the Anti-Spoofing Penalties Modernization Act of 2019, a bill that would double the penalties for robocalling from $10,000 to $20,000 upon violation and increase the maximum fine from $1 million to $2 million. Collins reflected on the 93 million robocalls received in her home state of Maine the previous year and asserted that ending illegal robocalls would "take an aware public, aggressive action by regulators and law enforcement agencies, and a coordinated effort at every level of our telecommunications industry", citing the Anti-Spoofing Penalties Modernization Act as an important tool in this effort.

=== United States Postal Service ===
In 2006, Collins was the prime sponsor of the Postal Accountability and Enhancement Act.

In March 2019, Collins was a cosponsor of a bipartisan resolution led by Gary Peters and Jerry Moran that opposed privatization of the United States Postal Service (USPS), citing the USPS as an establishment that was self-sustained and noting concerns that a potential privatization could cause higher prices and reduced services for customers of the USPS, with a particular impact on rural communities.

== Judicial appointments ==
In May 2005, Collins was one of fourteen senators (seven Democrats and seven Republicans) to forge a compromise on the Democrats' use of the judicial filibuster, thus allowing the Republican leadership to end debate without having to exercise the nuclear option. Under the agreement, the minority party agreed that it would filibuster President George W. Bush's judicial nominees only in "extraordinary circumstances"; three Bush appellate court nominees (Janice Rogers Brown, Priscilla Richman, and William Pryor) would receive a vote by the full Senate; and two others, Henry Saad and William Myers, were expressly denied such protection (both eventually withdrew their names from consideration).

Collins voted for the confirmation of George W. Bush Supreme Court nominees Samuel Alito and John G. Roberts, as well Barack Obama Supreme Court nominees Elena Kagan and Sonia Sotomayor.

After President Obama nominated Merrick Garland to the Supreme Court, Collins publicly opposed the Senate Republican leadership's decision to refuse to consider the nomination, and urged her Republican colleagues to "follow regular order" and give Garland a confirmation hearing and a vote in the Senate Judiciary Committee in the normal fashion.

In 2017, Collins voted for the confirmation of President Trump's nomination of John K. Bush for Circuit Judge of the United States Court of Appeals for the Sixth Circuit. During his confirmation hearings it was disclosed that he had authored pseudonymous blog posts in which he disparaged gay rights, compared abortion to slavery, and linked to articles on right-wing conspiracy theory websites.

In 2017 and 2018, Collins was one of two Senate Republicans (the other being Lisa Murkowski) who were opposed to efforts by Senate Majority Leader Mitch McConnell and the rest of the Senate Republican leadership to change the Senate's rules in order to speed up Senate confirmation of President Donald Trump's judicial nominees.

Also in 2018, Collins was one of three Republican Senators, along with Jeff Flake (Arizona) and Murkowski, who supported an FBI investigation into sexual assault allegations made against Trump's second Supreme Court nominee, Brett Kavanaugh. She later announced her decision to vote in favor of his confirmation, stating that the "presumption of innocence" should be retained regarding Kavanaugh's sexual assault allegations and that she did not believe he would overturn Roe v. Wade. Her vote sparked opposition, including fundraising for her next hypothetical opponent, and increased speculation about possible Democratic challengers in 2020. Collins stated that she felt "vindication" in December 2018 when Kavanaugh voted with the court's liberal justices to decline to hear two cases against Planned Parenthood, thus allowing lower court rulings in favor of Planned Parenthood to stand. However, in February 2019, Kavanaugh voted to uphold a Louisiana abortion law which effectively shuttered most of the state's abortion clinics (the law was blocked by the Court's majority). On May 2, 2022, Politico ran an exclusive article of the confirmed legitimate leaked opinion of the court where Brett Kavanaugh voted to overturn Roe v. Wade. Subsequent to the release of this leaked opinion Susan Collins stated, “If this leaked draft opinion is the final decision and this reporting is accurate, it would be completely inconsistent with what Justice Gorsuch and Justice Kavanaugh said in their hearings and in our meetings in my office,.” On May 11, 2022, after the leaked opinion became public, Senator Collins voted against a bill to codify Roe v. Wade into federal law.

Collins endorsed another controversial judicial nominee in 2018: Thomas Farr, whose federal court nomination by President Trump was controversial due to his support for North Carolina laws that were ruled to be discriminatory toward African-American voters.

In March 2019, Collins became the first Republican to announce opposition to Chad Readler's nomination for the 6th U.S. Circuit Court of Appeals, citing his "role in the government's failure to defend provisions under current law that protect individuals with pre-existing conditions". In May 2019, she was the only Republican to vote against the confirmation of Wendy Vitter as a federal judge citing controversial statements that Vitter had made about abortion as well as her declining to say whether Brown v. Board was rightly decided. She also opposed the nomination of Matthew Kacsmaryk as a district judge over his opposition to LGBTQ rights and his comments against abortion rights. She was the only Republican to vote against advancing the nomination of Kacsmryk.

By June 2019, Collins, who has stated that she is pro-choice, had supported more than 90% of President Trump's judicial nominees. 32 of these judges had indicated that they opposed abortion rights, according to the abortion rights organization NARAL. A spokeswoman for Collins said that Collins has voted for 90% of both Democratic and Republican nominees and that she ignores the personal beliefs of judicial nominees, but considers if they "can set aside these beliefs and rule fairly and impartially." In December 2019, Collins was the only Republican to vote against ending debate as well as against the final confirmation of Sarah Pitlyk as a federal judge citing concerns about Pitlyk's opposition to abortion and fertility treatments.

In October 2020, Collins was of two Republican Senators, the other being Lisa Murkowski, to vote against a motion to enter an executive session which would move forward with a vote to confirm Judge Amy Coney Barrett, Pres. Trump's third nominee to the Supreme Court. Collins, in the final vote, had intended to vote "no" on the final vote, however Murkowski announced she would vote "yes". She cited the Merrick Garland Supreme Court nomination and the standard set during that nomination, and also noted that this nomination is being voted on much closer to the election. On October 26, 2020, she joined all members of the Democratic caucus in voting against Barrett's confirmation.

As of August 2021, Collins had voted for all of Pres. Joe Biden's judicial nominees to date. In November 2021, Collins was one of two Republicans, along with Lisa Murkowski, who voted with the Democratic caucus, in a 51-45 vote, to confirm Beth Robinson, the first openly lesbian to be confirmed to the federal circuit courts, to the US Court of Appeals for the Second Circuit. She was one of three Republican Senators, joined by Mitt Romney and Lisa Murkowski, to vote with Democrats to advance the nomination of Judge Ketanji Brown Jackson forward to a floor vote. Collins was the first Republican to announce her decision to vote to confirm Ketanji Brown Jackson to the Supreme Court. On April 7, 2022, she voted to confirm Jackson to the Supreme Court.

== Immigration and trade ==
Collins voted against free-trade agreements including the Dominican Republic–Central America Free Trade Agreement. In 1999, she was one of four Republicans (along with her colleague Olympia Snowe) to vote for a Wellstone amendment to the Trade and Development Act of 2000 which would have conditioned trade benefits for Caribbean countries on "compliance with internationally recognized labor rights".

As ranking member of the Homeland Security and Governmental Affairs Committee, Collins and committee Chairman Joe Lieberman voiced concerns about budget, outside contractors, privacy and civil liberties relating to the National Cybersecurity Center, the Comprehensive National Cybersecurity Initiative and United States Department of Homeland Security plans to enhance Einstein, the program which protects federal networks. Citing improved security and the benefits of information sharing, as of mid-2008, Collins was satisfied with the response the committee received from Secretary Michael Chertoff.

In 2007, she voted against the McCain-Kennedy proposal which would have given amnesty to undocumented immigrants. In 2010, Collins voted against the DREAM Act. However, in 2013, Collins was one of 14 Republicans who voted for a comprehensive immigration bill that included border security and a pathway to citizenship for undocumented immigrants.

In November 2014, following President Obama's decision to achieve immigration reform through executive action with a plan to give deportation relief to as many as 5 million undocumented immigrants, Collins stated that the president was "a huge mistake from both the political and policy perspective" and that members of his own party agreed with her.

In 2016, Collins cosponsored a bill requiring the Department of Homeland Security evaluate security threats at the northern border and said that it would mandate the federal government to consider tools border security officials would need in the prevention of drug and human trafficking.

Collins criticized President Donald Trump's 2017 executive order to ban entry to the U.S. to citizens of seven Muslim-majority countries, stating: "The worldwide refugee ban set forth in the executive order is overly broad and implementing it will be immediately problematic." In 2018, Susan Collins co-sponsored bipartisan comprehensive immigration reform which would have granted a pathway to citizenship to 1.8 million Dreamers while also giving $25 billion to border security; at the same time, Collins voted against the McCain/Coons proposal for a pathway to citizenship without funding for a border wall as well as against the Republican proposal backed by Trump to reduce and restrict legal immigration.

When President Trump and Jeff Sessions announced a 'zero-tolerance' policy on migrants at the border and separated children from parents, Susan Collins opposed the move and urged Trump to "put an end" to the separation of families. She said that separating children from parents at the border is "inconsistent with American values." However, she said that she did not support the Democratic bill to stop the separation of families and said that she instead supports the bipartisan bill she proposed in February to give a pathway to citizenship for 2 million undocumented immigrants and provide $25 billion in border security. In 2019, she introduced bipartisan legislation to oppose Trump's declaration emergency at the southern border in order to build a wall. She was one of a dozen Republicans who broke with their party, joining all Democrats, to vote for the resolution rejecting the emergency declaration.

In October 2018, following President Trump announcing his intent to issue an executive order that would revoking birthright citizenship for the children of noncitizens and unauthorized immigrants born in the United States, Collins stated that she disagreed entirely with the planned executive order and that anyone born in the US was an American. Collins speculated that the executive order would be subject to a court challenge and the order would be invalidated by the courts.

In June 2019, Collins and fellow Maine senator Angus King released a joint statement confirming that they had questioned U.S. Customs and Border Protection "on the process being used to clear" asylum seekers for transportation to Portland, Maine and opined that it was "clearly not a sustainable approach to handling the asylum situation." Collins and King were said to both be "interested in providing additional resources to the federal agencies that process asylum claims, so we can reduce the existing backlog and adjudicate new claims in a more timely fashion." In December 2019, Collins introduced legislation to allow migrants seeking asylum to work sooner in the US diverging from the Trump administration's view.

== Economic issues ==
Susan Collins had a mixed record on the Bush tax cuts. In 2004, she joined other "Senate moderates -- John McCain of Arizona, Olympia J. Snowe...of Maine, and Lincoln Chafee of Rhode Island" in opposing how the Bush administration wanted to implement the tax cuts. The four Republicans cited deficit concerns as a reason for opposing the tax cut plans. Collins voted in favor of and for the extension of the Bush tax cuts in 2003 and 2006.

She offered an amendment to the original bill that allowed for tax credits to school teachers who purchase classroom materials.

Ultimately, Collins was one of just three Republican lawmakers to vote for the American Recovery and Reinvestment Act, earning heated criticism from the right for crossing party lines on the bill.

In mid-December 2009, she was again one of three Republican senators to back a $1.1 trillion appropriations bill for the fiscal year beginning in 2010, joining Thad Cochran and Kit Bond in compensating for three Democratic "nay" votes to pass the bill over a threatened GOP filibuster.

In May 2011, Collins was one of 17 senators to sign a letter to Commodity Futures Trading Commission Chairman Gary Gensler requesting a regulatory crackdown on speculative Wall Street trading in oil contracts, asserting that they had entered "a time of economic emergency for many American families" while noting that the average retail price of regular grade gasoline was $3.95 nationwide. The senators requested that the CFTC adopt speculation limits in regard to markets where contracts for future delivery of oil are traded.

In February 2012, after Senate leaders reached a compromise to lower the threshold for the number of votes needed to pass bills, Collins was one of 14 Republican senators to vote for legislation that extended a 2 percentage-point cut in the payroll tax for the remainder of the year and provided an extension of federal unemployment benefits along with preventing doctors' payments under Medicare from being cut.

In April 2014, the United States Senate debated the Minimum Wage Fairness Act (S. 1737; 113th Congress). The bill would amend the Fair Labor Standards Act of 1938 (FLSA) to increase the federal minimum wage for employees to $10.10 per hour over a two-year period. The bill was strongly supported by President Barack Obama and many of the Democratic Senators, but strongly opposed by Republicans in the Senate and House. Collins tried to negotiate a compromise bill that centrist Republicans could agree to, but was unable to do so.

Collins argued that the Congressional Budget Office report predicting 500,000 jobs lost if the minimum wage was increased to $10.10. The same report also said that an increase to $9.00 would only lead to 100,000 jobs lost, but the argument did not persuade her fellow centrists. She said, "I'm confident that the votes are not there to pass a minimum wage increase up to $10.10; therefore it seems to me to make sense for senators on both sides of the aisle to get together and see if we can come up with a package that would help low-income families with [sic] causing the kind of job loss that the Congressional Budget Office has warned against."

Collins opposed cutting the tax rate for income earners making more than $1 million a year and also opposed eliminating the estate tax. She stated that she did not see a need to eliminate the estate tax. She was also one of two Republicans to vote with Democrats against budget cuts.

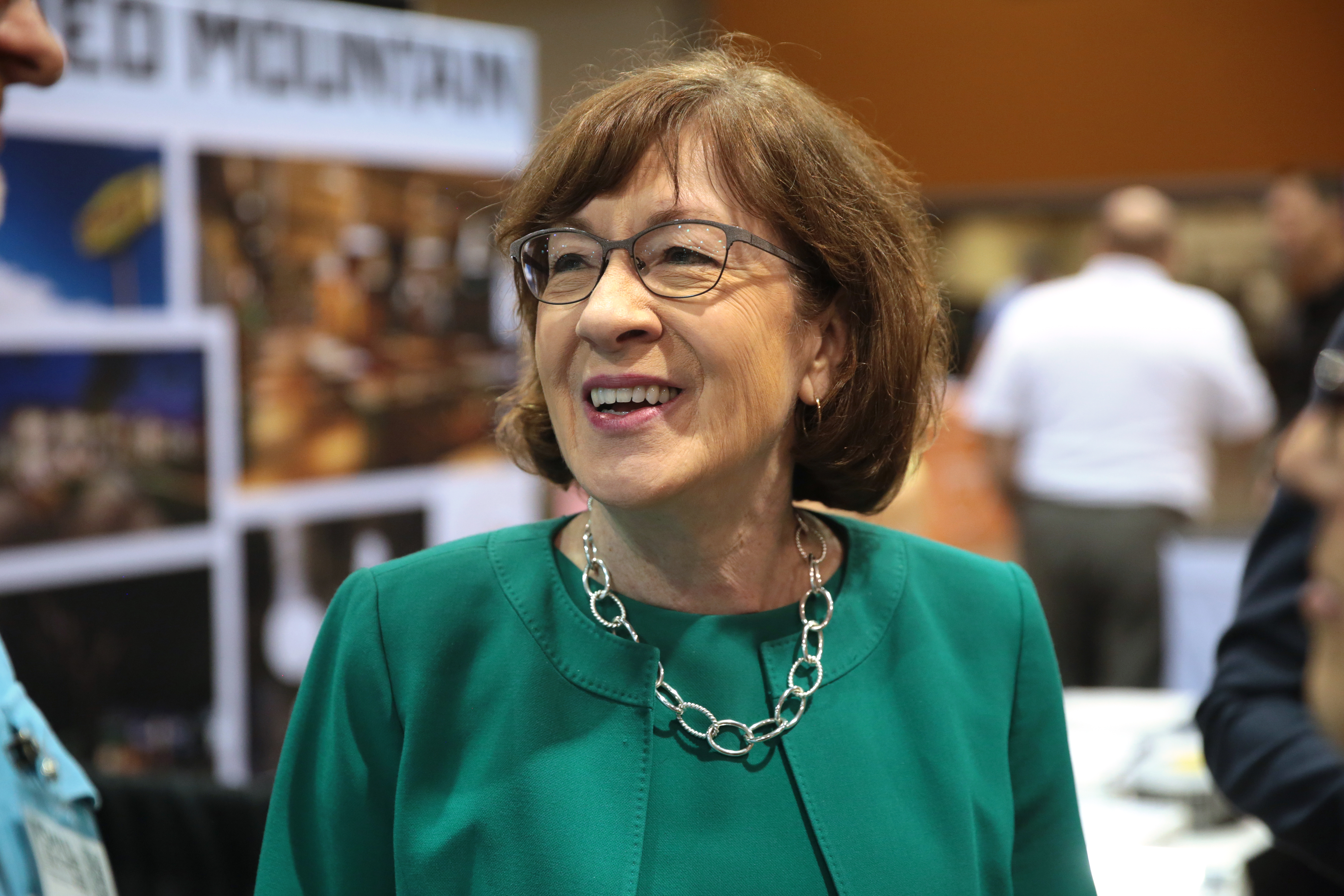
Collins at the 2018 Small Business Expo in Phoenix, Arizona

In December 2017, Collins voted for the 2017 Republican tax plan. The bill would greatly reduce corporate taxes, reduce taxes for some individuals but increase them for other individuals by removing some popular deductions, and increase the deficit. The bill also repealed the individual mandate of the Affordable Care Act, leaving 13 million Americans uninsured and raising premiums by an estimated additional 10% per year. After the vote, Collins said that she received assurances from congressional leaders that they would pass legislation intended to mitigate some of the adverse effects of the repeal of the individual mandate. When asked how she could vote for a bill that would raise the deficit by an estimated $1 trillion (over 10 years) after having railed against the deficit during the Obama administration, Collins insisted that the tax plan would not raise the deficit. She said she had been advised in this determination by economists Glenn Hubbard, Larry Lindsey, and Douglas Holtz-Eakin, but Hubbard and Holtz-Eakin later denied stating that the plan would not increase the deficit.

In March 2018, Collins and fellow Maine senator Angus King introduced the Northern Border Regional Commission Reauthorization Act, a bill that would bolster the Northern Border Regional Commission and was included in the 2018 United States farm bill. In June 2019, when Collins and King announced the Northern Border Regional Commission (NBRC) would award grant funding to the University of Maine, the senators called the funding an investment in the forest economy of Maine that would "help those who have relied on this crucial sector for generations" and "bolster efforts by UMaine to open more opportunities in rural communities."

In May 2018, Collins was one of 12 senators to sign a letter to Federal Labor Relations Authority (FLRA) Chairman Colleen Kiko urging the FLRA to end efforts to close its Boston regional office until Congress debated the matter, furthering that the FLRA closing down its seven regional offices would cause staff to be placed farther away from the federal employees whose rights they protected.

In August 2018, it was reported that House Republicans were considering another round of tax cuts upon returning to Congress. Collins responded by saying she was opposed to more and was instead interested in amending the Tax Cuts and Jobs Act to address "certain inequities", citing a reduction in the corporate tax cut and using the money to make the individual tax cuts permanent, as some of the parts needing fixing.

On December 6, 2018, Senator Collins cast the deciding vote to make Kathy Kraninger the Director of the Consumer Financial Protection Bureau, which cleared the United States Senate by a margin of 50–49, with all 50 present Republicans voting in support and all 49 Democrats voting in opposition.

In January 2019, Collins voted for both Republican and Democratic bills to end a government shutdown. She was one of six Republicans to break with their party and vote for the Democratic proposal. Later that month, after President Trump signed a bill reopening the government for three weeks, Collins stated that the shutdown had not accomplished anything and advocated for Congress to pass a spending measure funding the government for the remainder of the fiscal year. She further stated that they "cannot have the threat of a government shutdown hanging over our people and our economy." In March, Collins was the only Republican senator to sign a letter opining that contractor workers and by extension their families "should not be penalized for a government shutdown that they did nothing to cause" while noting that there were bills in both chambers of Congress to provide back pay to contractor employees for lost wages, before urging the Appropriations Committee "to include back pay for contractor employees in a supplemental appropriations bill for FY2019 or as part of the regular appropriations process for FY2020."

In March 2019, after President Trump proposed a $4.7 trillion budget that reduced domestic spending by 5 percent while increasing defense spending by 4 percent to $750 billion and included $8.6 billion for his proposed border wall, Collins stated that they needed to "come together and decide on a new package for what the spending caps are going to be" and there would a be a reset to the Budget Control Act of 2011 if the proposed budget's spending caps were not reset.

In April 2019, Collins, Shelley Moore Capito, and Chris Coons introduced the Sustainable Chemistry Research and Development Act of 2019, a bill that would support development of new and innovative chemicals, products, and processes and also focus on the efficient use of resources and reduction or elimination of exposure to hazardous substances. Collins commented that the bill would authorize grants, training, and educational opportunities for scientists and engineers.

In May 2019, Collins, Angus King, and Lamar Alexander joined Assistant Secretary in the Office of Energy Efficiency and Renewable Energy Daniel Simmons and Maine officials in announcing the formation of a research collaboration between the University of Maine and the Oak Ridge National Laboratory to advance attempts to 3D print using wood products. Collins stated that the initiative was a win for all parties involved and would "bolster the cutting-edge research performed at the University of Maine as well as support job creation in our state" and called the project "an outstanding example of our national labs working cooperatively with universities to drive American innovation and strengthen our economy."

In 2019, Collins worked with Democrat Kyrsten Sinema on the Senior Security Act, legislation intended to form a task force at the Securities and Exchange Commission (SEC) that would "examine and identify challenges facing senior investors" and report its findings to Congress along with recommended regulatory or statutory changes every two years.

In 2019, while President Trump and top aides met with Republican leadership for discussions about avoiding a budget debacle that fall, Collins observed, "A lot of the cuts that they made in the president's budget were arbitrary and made without any consultation at all. An example would be zeroing out the Community Development Block Grant fund." She added that the aforementioned fund was the one most requested by members of the Appropriations panel to fund.

In June 2019, Collins and Democrat Tom Carper introduced a bill they described as combatting "problems federal firefighters face when they try to prove their injuries took place in the line of duty" and stated that federal laws placed burdens on federal firefighters so that they had to prove cancers and other diseases were the result of exposure during their work.

In 2021, Collins crossed the aisle to vote with the Democratic caucus on several votes related to economic issues. In August 2021, she was among the 19 Republicans in the Senate who voted with the Democratic caucus to pass the bipartisan $1.2 trillion infrastructure bill. In October 2021, she was one of 15 Republicans who voted with the Democratic caucus to approve a temporary spending bill in order to avoid a government shutdown. That same month, she joined 10 other Republicans in voting with the Democratic majority to break the filibuster on raising the debt ceiling. However, she voted with all other Republicans against the bill itself to raise the debt ceiling.

== Education ==
In July 2007, after the Senate voted 95–0 to boost the amount of federal aid low-income student can receive and undo some conflicts of interest for the student-loan industry, Collins stated that the reauthorization "brings back a balance between [lender] subsidies and financial aid" due to removing some funds away from lenders but not cutting them out completely from the system and that private lenders were "healthy for the marketplace."

In June 2014, along with Bob Corker and Lisa Murkowski, Collins was one of three Republicans to vote for the Bank on Students Emergency Loan Refinancing Act, a Democratic proposal authored by Elizabeth Warren that would authorize more than 25 million people to refinance their student loans into lower interest rates of less than 4 percent. The bill received 56 votes and was successfully blocked by Republicans.

In September 2017, along with Rob Portman, Bob Casey Jr., and Tammy Baldwin, Collins cosponsored a bipartisan bill that would extend the Perkins Loan Program by two years when it was then set to expire by the end of the month. Collins noted that in her state "more than 4,000 students received a Perkins Loan last year, providing nearly $8.6 million in aid," and that the extension would "provide students in Maine and across our country with the critical certainty required to plan for and afford higher education."

In February 2019, Collins was one of 20 senators to sponsor the Employer Participation in Repayment Act, enabling employers to contribute up to $5,250 to the student loans of their employees as a means of granting employees relief and incentivizing applicants to apply to jobs with employers who implement the policy.

== Healthcare ==
In April 1997, Collins was one of seven Republicans to cosponsor legislation introduced by Ted Kennedy and Orrin Hatch that would provide children's health insurance by raising the cigarette tax. Later that month, Collins said she disapproved of the cigarette tax provision and that she wanted other ways to finance the insurance.

On January 29, 2009, Collins voted in favor of the State Children's Health Insurance Program Reauthorization Act (H.R. 2).

During negotiations on passing stimulus legislation during the financial crisis, Collins successfully removed $870 million from the legislation which was intended for pandemic protection.

Collins opposed President Barack Obama's health reform legislation, the Affordable Care Act (aka Obamacare), and voted against it in December 2009. She also voted against the Health Care and Education Reconciliation Act of 2010. Senate Republicans made an effort to delay or kill the health care legislation through a filibuster of the defense spending bill; however, the filibuster was defeated and Collins was one of three Republicans who voted with Democrats to end the filibuster.

With the passage of the Obama administration-supported 21st Century Cures Act in December 2016, legislation increasing funding for disease research while addressing flaws in the American mental health systems and altering drugs and medical devices' regulatory system. Collins stated, "I doubt that there is a family in America who will not be touched by this important legislation."

In January 2017, at the beginning of the 115th Congress, Collins voted in favor of a bill to begin the repeal of the Affordable Care Act ("Obamacare"). Collins and Senator Bill Cassidy proposed legislation permitting states to either keep the ACA or move to a replacement program funded in part by the federal government. In January 2017, Collins "was the only Republican to vote for a defeated amendment...that would have prevented the Senate from adopting legislation cutting Social Security, Medicare or Medicaid."

In March 2017, Collins said that she could not support the American Health Care Act, the House Republicans' plan to repeal and replace the ACA. Collins announced she would vote against the Senate version of the Republican bill to repeal Obamacare. Collins clarified that she was against repealing the Affordable Care Act without a replacement proposal.

On July 26, 2017, Collins was one of seven Republicans voting against repealing the ACA without a suitable replacement. On July 27, the following day, Collins joined two other Republicans in voting 'No' to the 'Skinny' repeal of the ACA.

In August 2017, Collins and Democrat Jeanne Shaheen sent a letter to Centers for Medicare and Medicaid Services (CMS) Administrator Seema Verma requesting the CMS to offer Medicare coverage for clinically appropriate treatment, opining that the effectiveness of diabetes management was "crucial to holding down health care costs and helping seniors manage their diabetes successfully to allow them to continue to live healthy and productive lives" and urged the CMS to conduct a "careful review of Medicare coverage policies for patch pumps and other life-saving therapies for diabetes, in accordance with applicable laws and regulations, and to review the procedures at the CMS that have resulted in these disparities in coverage."

In October 2017, Collins called for President Trump to support a bipartisan Congressional effort led by Lamar Alexander and Patty Murray to reinstate insurer payments, stating that what Trump was doing was "affecting people's access and the cost of health care right now".

In December 2017, Collins voted for a tax bill that repealed the Affordable Care Act's individual mandate, which the CBO estimated would increase the number of uninsured Americans by 13 million while causing higher health care premiums for those who remained insured. Collins made a deal with Senate Majority Leader Mitch McConnell, trading her opposition to repealing the Affordable Care Act's individual mandate provision for legislation that would financially stabilize the remaining health insurance program. "But after Collins voted for the tax reform package, McConnell reneged and never brought the stabilization bill up for a vote. In 2018, she was the only Republican who voted with Democrats on a resolution, that ultimately did not pass, against the "low cost, low coverage" insurance plans allowed by an executive order of President Trump.

In June 2018, Collins and fellow Maine Senator Angus King released a statement endorsing a proposal by FCC Chairman Ajit Pai intended to boost funding for the Rural Health Care Program of the Universal Service Fund, stating that "with demand for RHC funding continuing to rise, any further inaction would risk leaving rural healthcare practitioners without lifesaving telemedicine services. This long-overdue funding increase would be a boon to both healthcare providers and patients in rural communities across our country."

In December 2018, Collins criticized the decision by a judge to overturn the Affordable Care Act. Asked if she regretted voting for the Republican tax reform of 2017 which zeroed out the individual mandate of the ACA and was used as a justification for the judge's ruling, Collins said she did not regret it.

In January 2019, Collins was a cosponsor of the Community Health Investment, Modernization, and Excellence (CHIME) Act, a bipartisan bill that would continue federal funding of community health centers and the National Health Service Corps (NHSC) beyond that year's September 30 deadline for five years and would provide both with yearly federal funding increases beginning in fiscal year 2020.

In March 2019, Collins, Shelley Moore Capito, and Debbie Stabenow introduced the Improving Health Outcomes, Planning, and Education (HOPE) for Alzheimer's Act, legislation mandating the United States Department of Health and Human Services (HHS) conduct outreach to health care practitioners regarding several Alzheimer's disease care services and benefits and would be followed by HHS reporting on the rates of utilization of the services and barriers to access.

In April 2019, in response to the Justice Department's announcing that it would side with a ruling by U.S. District Judge Reed O'Connor that the Affordable Care Act's individual mandate was unconstitutional and the rest of law was thereby invalid, Collins sent a letter to United States Attorney General William Barr expressing her disappointment with the decision and that the department's support for the ruling put "critical consumer provisions" of the ACA at risk. She opined that the Trump administration "should not attempt to use the courts to bypass Congress."

In a May 2019 letter to Attorney General Barr, Collins and Joe Manchin wrote that the Affordable Care Act "is quite simply the law of the land, and it is the Administration's and your Department's duty to defend it" and asserted that Congress could "work together to fix legislatively the parts of the law that aren't working" without letting the position of a federal court "stand and devastate millions of seniors, young adults, women, children and working families."

On May 21, 2019, Collins and Tammy Duckworth introduced the Veterans Preventive Health Coverage Fairness Act, a bill that would eliminate out-of-pocket costs for preventive health medications and prescription drugs along with introducing preventive medications and services to the list of no-fee treatments covered by the Veterans Affairs Department. Collins said the bill "would protect patients from experiencing serious illnesses that are costly to treat and promote the health and well-being of our veterans" through abolishing the copayment requirement related to preventive health care.

In October 2019, Collins was one of 27 senators to sign a letter to Senate Majority Leader Mitch McConnell and Senate Minority Leader Chuck Schumer advocating the passage of the Community Health Investment, Modernization, and Excellence (CHIME) Act, which was set to expire the following month. The senators warned that if the funding for the Community Health Center Fund (CHCF) was allowed to expire, it "would cause an estimated 2,400 site closures, 47,000 lost jobs, and threaten the health care of approximately 9 million Americans." In March, 2021, she was the only Republican voting with Democrats to confirm Xavier Becerra as the HHS Secretary, with one Democrat not voting, resulting in a 50-49 vote in favor of confirmation.

== Environmental issues ==
In September 2008, Collins joined the Gang of 20, a bipartisan group seeking a comprehensive energy reform bill. The group is pushing for a bill that would encourage state-by-state decisions on offshore drilling and authorize billions of dollars for conservation and alternative energy.

In September 2010, Collins backed a bill introduced by Senate Energy Committee Chair Jeff Bingaman and Sam Brownback that would establish a Renewable Electricity Standard (RES) requiring the generation of 15 percent renewable power through utilities by 2021. The legislation was said by President of the United Steelworkers union Leo Gerard to "protect and create hundreds of thousands of good-paying jobs and keep America in the clean energy race."

The Carbon Limits and Energy for America's Renewal (CLEAR) Act (S. 2877), also called the Cantwell-Collins bill, would have directed the Secretary of the Treasury "to establish a program to regulate the entry of fossil carbon into commerce in the United States to promote renewable energy, jobs and economic growth."

In November 2011, as the Obama administration drew condemnation from Republicans over the president's climate policy, Collins was one of six Republicans to vote against a resolution by Kentucky Senator Rand Paul that would overturn the Cross-State Air Pollution Rule, which mandated a reduction in smog and particulate-forming pollution through plants in 27 states.

In February 2017, Collins was the only Republican to vote against the Congressional Review Act (CRA) challenge undoing the Stream Protection Rule of the Interior Department. It was the first attempt by the Trump administration to undo an environmental regulation imposed by the Obama administration.

In February 2017, Collins was the only Senate Republican to vote against confirmation of Scott Pruitt to lead the Environmental Protection Agency. Fourteen months later, on CNN's "State of the Union," she said regarding his actions as the EPA head, "whether it's trying to undermine the Clean Power Plan or weaken the restrictions on lead or undermine the methane rules," his behavior has validated her "no" vote.

In May 2017, Collins was one of three Republicans who joined Democrats in voting against a repeal of Obama's regulations for drilling on public lands; the repeal effort was rejected by a 49-51 margin.

In September 2017, along with Lamar Alexander, Collins was one of two Republican senators on the Senate Appropriations Committee to vote for an amendment by Jeff Merkley restoring funding for the U.N.'s Framework Convention on Climate Change in the appropriations bill of the State Department that had been given annually by the US since 1992 and that President Trump had advocated for ending in his first budget proposal earlier that year.

In September 2017, Collins and John Hoeven sent a letter to Health and Human Services Secretary Tom Price in which they called the Low-Income Home Energy Assistance Program "the main federal program that helps low-income households and seniors with their energy bills, providing critical assistance during the cold winter and hot summer months" and advocated for the program to be distributed as quickly as possible.

In 2019, Collins was a cosponsor of the Securing Energy Infrastructure Act, a bill that would form a two-year pilot program with national laboratories that would study security vulnerabilities and research in addition to testing technology for the purpose of isolating the most critical systems from cyberattacks with a focus on segments of the energy sector where cybersecurity incidents can result in the most damage. Collins stated the increase in the potential of a devastating cyber-attack with each day and cited the importance of taking "commonsense steps now to eliminate vulnerabilities and protect our energy infrastructure from future disruption." The bill passed in the Senate in July of that year, and its companion version in the House was passed as an amendment to the Intelligence Authorization Act.

On February 28, 2019, Collins was the only Republican senator to vote against the confirmation of Andrew Wheeler as EPA administrator, Collins in a statement saying she believed Wheeler was qualified for the position but she also had "too many concerns with the actions he has taken during his tenure as Acting Administrator to be able to support his promotion."

Collins has been a strong proponent of wood biomass as "a cost-effective, renewable, and environmentally friendly source of energy". In her arguments for biomass on the Senate floor, she repeated almost verbatim talking points from a biomass industry group's website.

In March 2019, Collins and Lisa Murkowski were the only Republican senators to sign a letter to the Trump administration advocating for the inclusion of funding for the Low-Income Home Energy Assistance Program (LIHEAP), which they credited with helping "to ensure that eligible recipients do not have to choose between paying their energy bills and affording other necessities like food and medicine", and the Weatherization Assistance Program (WAP) in the fiscal year 2020 budget proposal.

In March 2019, in response to the EPA releasing a proposal that would revoke findings asserting the necessity of mercury emissions regulations the previous December, Collins was one of six senators to send a letter to EPA Administrator Andrew Wheeler criticizing the proposal and expressing the position that evidence showed the effectiveness of the Mercury Rule.

In March 2019 Collins joined all Senate Republicans, three Democrats, and Angus King in voting against the Green New Deal resolution, a proposal that strove for net-zero greenhouse gas emissions in the US.

In April 2019, Collins was one of four senators to sponsor a bill granting a $7,000 tax credit to the next 400,000 buyers after an initial cap on vehicles from an automaker that exceeds 200,000 sales is hit. Collins argued in a statement that the legislation "would continue the momentum towards cleaner transportation and help tackle harmful transportation emissions."

In April 2019, Collins was one of five senators to cosponsor the Land and Water Conservation Fund Permanent Funding Act, bipartisan legislation that would provide permanent and dedicated funding for the Land and Water Conservation Fund (LWCF) at a level of $900 million as part of an effort to protect public lands.

In June 2019, Collins was one of eight senators to cosponsor the bipartisan Save Our Seas 2.0 Act, a bill unveiled by Dan Sullivan and Bob Menendez intended to spur innovation along with aiding in the reduction plastic waste's creation and both find ways to use already existing plastic waste to stop it from entering the oceans and address this problem on a global scale. The bill was meant to respond to the plastic pollution crisis threatening oceans, shorelines, marine life, and coastal economies and served as a continuation of the Save Our Seas Act.

In July 2019, Collins and Democrat Tammy Duckworth introduced the Sensible, Timely Relief for America's Nuclear Districts’ Economic Development (STRANDED) Act, a bill that would give economic impact grants to local government entities for the purpose of offsetting economic impacts of stranded nuclear waste in addition to forming a task force that would identify funding which already exists that could be used to benefit its respective community and form a competitive innovative solutions prize competition to aid those communities in their search for alternatives to "nuclear facilities, generating sites, and waste sites." Collins said the bill would "take interim steps to assist these adversely impacted communities" while stating the requirement of the federal government to move forward with a lasting solution for nuclear waste under lawful means.

In July 2019, along with Democrats Chris Coons, Jeanne Shaheen, and Jack Reed, Collins was one of four senators and the only Republican to sponsor of a bill to extend the Weatherization Assistance Program through 2024, lauding the program as a "cost-effective way to reduce energy usage and cut low-income homeowners’ energy bills for the long-term."

== Gun policy ==
In January 2013, after President Barack Obama unveiled a gun control plan that included his calling on Congress to approve both an assault weapons ban and provide background checks for all gun buyers, Collins stated that she was disappointed none of President Obama's proposals "include a National Commission on Violence that I, along with several of my colleagues on both sides of the aisle, had recommended" and called for an examination into "whether states are reporting data on mentally ill individuals found to be a danger to themselves or others to the national background check database designed to prevent gun purchases by such individuals."

Collins voted for the unsuccessful Manchin–Toomey bill to amend federal law to expand background checks for gun purchases in 2013. She did vote against a ban of high-capacity magazines over 10 bullets. She has received a C+ grade on gun rights from the NRA, and D− from Gun Owners of America.

In 2018, Collins was a cosponsor of the NICS Denial Notification Act, legislation developed in the aftermath of the Stoneman Douglas High School shooting that would require federal authorities to inform states within a day of a prohibited person attempting to buy a firearm failing the National Instant Criminal Background Check System. Collins noted Maine as one of thirty-seven states where a prohibited person attempting to buy a firearm is not subject to law enforcement being required to be notified of the attempted purchase and promoted the bill as aiding the prevention of "dangerous people" obtaining illegal firearms while preserving the rights of law abiding gun owners.

In February 2019, Collins supported the Terrorist Firearms Prevention Act, legislation enabling the attorney general to deny the sale of a firearm to individuals on the no-fly list or selectee list that subject airline passengers to more screening. Collins stated, "If you are considered to be too dangerous to fly on an airplane, you should not be able to buy a firearm. This bill is a sensible step we can take right now to reform our nation's gun laws while protecting the Second Amendment rights of law-abiding Americans."

In July 2019, Collins and Democrat Patrick Leahy introduced the Stop Illegal Trafficking in Firearms Act of 2019, a bill that would establish penalties for individuals that have transferred a firearm and there being reasonable cause to believe that it will be used in a drug crime, crime of violence, or act of terrorism. Collins praised the bill as strengthening federal law through "making it easier for prosecutors to go after gun traffickers and straw purchasers" and entirely protecting "the rights of the vast majority of gun owners who are law-abiding citizens."

In an August 15, 2019 interview, Collins stated that it made sense to her if "we can come together working with President Trump working with colleagues from both sides of the aisle and say that if you advertise the sale of a firearm over the Internet there should be a background check" and confirmed she was working with Senators Pat Toomey and Joe Manchin and the White House "on making sure that we close some loopholes in the background check system to ensure that people with criminal records or who are mentally ill can not purchase firearms." Collins furthered that the difference between the new calls for gun control and previous instances were that three mass shootings had occurred "so close together" and that it was her hope that the "Democrats truly want a solution and some progress" on the matter as opposed to playing political games.

== Other issues ==
In June 2004, Collins voted for a proposal increasing the maximum penalty the Federal Communications Commission could issue in response to decency violations on television and radio from $27,500 to $275,000 and setting a limit of $3 million for a violation either receiving or producing multiple complaints.

In April 2014, the United States Senate debated the Paycheck Fairness Act (S. 2199; 113th Congress). It was a bill that "punishes employers for retaliating against workers who share wage information, puts the justification burden on employers as to why someone is paid less and allows workers to sue for punitive damages of wage discrimination." Collins voted against ending debate on the bill, saying that one of her reasons for doing so was that Majority Leader Harry Reid had refused to allow votes on any of the amendments that Republicans had suggested for the bill.

In 2015, as part of the fiscal year 2016 budget of the Obama administration, the United States Department of Veterans Affairs asked congressional authorization for consent to spend $6.8 million toward leasing 56,600 square feet at an unspecified location in Portland, Maine, for expansion of a clinic providing basic medical and mental health care for southern Maine veterans. Collins supported the proposal, releasing a statement along with Angus King saying that ensuring Maine veterans had access to high quality care "is one of our top priorities, and we’re pursuing the input of local veterans and interested stakeholders to understand their perspective about the proposal."

In September 2016, Collins and Democrat Mark Warner unveiled a bill that directed the Departments of Labor and Treasury to authorize employers and sole proprietors to file one form to satisfy reporting requirements, as opposed to separate forms for each individual plan. Collins stated in a press release that Americans were not "saving enough to be able to afford a comfortable retirement" and cited an estimate by the Center for Retirement Research that there was roughly a $7.7 trillion gap between the funds Americans had saved for retirement and what they actually needed.

In January 2017, both Collins and Senator Lisa Murkowski voted for Donald Trump's selection for Secretary of Education, Betsy DeVos, within the Senate Health, Education, Labor and Pensions Committee, passing DeVos' nomination by a vote of 12–11 to allow the full Senate to vote on the nominee. Collins justified her support vote due by saying, "Presidents are entitled to considerable deference in the selection of Cabinet members". Later, Collins and Murkowski became the only Republicans to break the party line and vote against the nominee. This caused a 50–50 tie that was broken by Senate President Mike Pence to successfully confirm DeVos' appointment.

Another noted involvement in the Trump Cabinet confirmation process for Collins was her formal introduction of Sen. Jeff Sessions (R-AL) to the Judiciary Committee for its hearings on Sessions nomination to be Attorney General.

On December 14, 2017, the same day that the FCC was set to hold a vote on net neutrality, Collins, along with Angus King, sent a letter to the FCC asking that the vote be postponed so as to allow for public hearings on the merits of repealing net neutrality. Collins and King expressed concerns that repealing net neutrality could adversely affect the US economy. As part of this drive, Collins is reported to support using the authority under the Congressional Review Act to nullify the FCC's repeal vote. In 2018, Collins was one of three Republicans voting with Democrats to repeal rule changes enacted by the Republican-controlled FCC. The measure was meant to restore Obama-era net neutrality rules.

In February 2019, Collins was one of 25 original cosponsors to the Restore Our Parks Act, creating the National Park Service Legacy Restoration Fund in an effort to reduce the maintenance backlog through allocation of existing government revenues from on- and offshore energy development. The funding would be derived from 50 percent of all revenues not otherwise allocated and deposited into the General Treasury, not exceeding $1.3 billion every year for the following five years.

In June 2019, Collins and Democrat Doug Jones cosponsored the American Broadband Buildout Act of 2019, a bill that requested $5 billion for a matching funds program admninistered by the Federal Communications Commission to "give priority to qualifying projects." The bill also mandated that at least 15% of funding go to high-cost and geographically challenged areas and authorized recipients of the funding to form "public awareness" and "digital literacy" campaigns to further awareness of the "value and benefits of broadband internet access service." This bill served as a companion to the Broadband Data Improvement Act.

In June 2019, Collins was one of 33 senators to cosponsor legislation that would establish a "National Post-Traumatic Stress Awareness Day" on June 27 in addition to designating the month of June as "National Post-Traumatic Stress Awareness Month." Kevin Cramer, a cosponsor of the bill, said the designation "shines a light on the resources available to veterans and reaffirms our commitment to ensuring they receive the care and assistance they need."

== Notable legislation ==
Collins introduced a bill in June 2013 that would define a "full-time employee" as someone who works for 40 hours per week (instead of 30 hours). The Affordable Care Act (ACA) defined a full-time worker as someone who works 30 hours per week. Collins is cited as saying that her bill would help prevent employers reducing workers' hours to below 30 per week in order to comply with the ACA.

In September 2013, Collins introduced a bill aimed at preventing Sudden Unexpected Infant Death Syndrome (SUIDS). The bill, dubbed The Child Care Infant Mortality Prevention Act, aimed to raise the amount of provider training in infant wards as well as enhanced CPR and first aid training. Backers of the bill hoped it would make a dent in the 4,000 children killed every year due to SUIDS. It would require the Health and Human Services Department to update their materials as well as improve their training resources to primary providers.

In May 2019, Collins introduced the TICK Act with Democrat Tina Smith, legislation devoting over $100 million in new federal spending to address Lyme and other tick-borne diseases. Collins noted in a Senate floor speech that tick-borne diseases had become a larger public health issue in the last 15 years and presented "grave risks to our public health and serious harm to our families and communities".
