= Dorkbot (malware) =

Family of malware worms that spreads through instant messaging

Dorkbot is a family of malware worms that spreads through instant messaging, USB drives, websites or social media channels like Facebook. Code Shikara is a computer worm, related to the Dorkbot family, that attacks through social engineering. Particularly prevalent in 2015, Dorkbot-infected systems were variously used to send spam, participate in DDoS attacks, or harvest users' credentials.

== Functionality ==
Dorkbot’s backdoor functionality allows a remote attacker to exploit infected systems. According to an analysis by Microsoft and Check Point Research, a remote attacker may be able to:

- Download and run a file from a specified URL;
- Collect login information and passwords through form grabbing, FTP, POP3, or Internet Explorer and Firefox cached login details; or
- Block or redirect certain domains and websites (e.g., security sites).

== Impact ==
A system infected with Dorkbot may be used to send spam, participate in DDoS attacks, or harvest users' credentials for online services, including banking services.

== Prevalence ==
Between May and December 2015, the Microsoft Malware Protection Center detected Dorkbot on an average of 100,000 infected machines each month.

== Remediation ==
In 2015, the U.S. Department of Homeland Security advised the following action to remediate Dorkbot infections:

- Use and maintain anti-virus software
- Change your passwords
- Keep your operating system and application software up-to-date
- Use anti-malware tools
- Disable AutoRun

== History ==
In 2011, Code Shikara was first identified by the Danish cyber security company CSIS. The AV-company Sophos reported in November 2011 that this threat mainly spreads itself through malicious links through the social network Facebook.

In 2013, Bitdefender Labs caught and blocked the worm, which is capable of spying on users' browsing activities, meanwhile stealing their personal online/offline information and/or credentials, commonly known as cybercrime. The infection was originally flagged by the online backup service MediaFire, who detected that the worm was being distributed camouflaged as an image file. Despite the misleading extension, MediaFire successfully identified the malicious image as an .exe-file. The malicious Shikara Code poses as a .jpeg image, but is indeed an executable file. As an IRC bot, the malware is simply integrated by the attackers from a control and command server. Besides stealing usernames and passwords, the bot herder may also order additional malware downloads.

MediaFire had then taken steps to address incorrect and misleading file extensions in an update, which identified and displayed a short description by identifying specific file types. To help users for this specific threat, the file sharing service also blocked files with double extensions, such as .jpg.exe, .png.exe, or .bmp.exe. Just like usual malware, the Backdoor.IRCBot.Dorkbot can update itself once installed on the victim's computer or other related devices.

The biggest risk is that someone's Facebook contacts may have had their account already compromised (due to sloppy password security, or granting access to a rogue application) and that the account user has been allured by clicking on a link seemingly posted by one of their friends.

Although the links pretend to point to an image, the truth is that a malicious screensaver is hidden behind an icon of two blonde women. After the code is launched, it attempts to download further malicious software hosted on a specific compromised Israeli domain. The malware is currently not present on the Israeli website. All that remains is a message, seemingly from the intruders, that says:

Hacked By ExpLodeMaSTer & By Ufuq

It is likely that they are using additional or other websites in continuing spreading their cyberattack(s). Some other popular baits tricking users to click on malicious links include Rihanna or Taylor Swift sex tapes.

On December 7, 2015, the FBI and Microsoft in a joint task force took down the Dorkbot Botnet.

== See also ==
- Alert (TA15-337A) – Family of malware worms that spreads through instant messaging
- Computer worm – Self-replicating malware program
- HackTool.Win32.HackAV
- Malware – Malicious software
- US-CERT
