= Anomaly Detection at Multiple Scales =

- Establishment: 2011
- Sponsor: DARPA
- Value: $35 million
- Goal: Detect insider threats in defense and government networks
- Website: www.darpa.mil

Anomaly Detection at Multiple Scales, or ADAMS was a $35 million DARPA project designed to identify patterns and anomalies in very large data sets. It is under DARPA's Information Innovation office and began in 2011 and ended in August 2014

The project was intended to detect and prevent insider threats such as "a soldier in good mental health becoming homicidal or suicidal", an "innocent insider becoming malicious", or "a government employee [who] abuses access privileges to share classified information". Specific cases mentioned are Nadal Malik Hasan and WikiLeaks source Chelsea Manning. Commercial applications may include finance. The intended recipients of the system output are operators in the counterintelligence agencies.

A final report was published on May 11, 2015, detailing a system known as Anomaly Detection Engine for Networks, or ADEN, developed by the University of Maryland, College Park, whose goal was to "identify malicious users within a network." Using multiple datasets from Wikipedia, Slashdot, and others, researchers were able to identify vandals and malicious users on a website using both conventional algorithms and artificial intelligence.

The Proactive Discovery of Insider Threats Using Graph Analysis and Learning was part of the ADAMS project. The Georgia Tech team includes noted high-performance computing researcher David Bader (computer scientist).

== See also ==
- Cyber Insider Threat
- Einstein (US-CERT program)
- Threat (computer)
- Intrusion detection
