= AusCERT =

Australian cybersecurity organization

- Headquarters: The University of Queensland
- Region served: Australasia
- Website: www.auscert.org.au

AusCERT is a non-profit organisation founded in 1993 that provides advice, education and solutions to cybersecurity threats and vulnerabilities.

Their office is located on the University of Queensland campus.

== History ==
In the early 1990s, Australian university student Nahshon Even-Chai hacked into the NASA computer system in his spare time. In response to this incident, three Australian universities (Queensland University of Technology, Griffith University, and the University of Queensland) formed AusCERT, which aimed to create a central source for information security and protection.

== Services ==
AusCERT services include phishing take-downs, security bulletins, incident notifications, sensitive information alerts, early warning SMS, and malicious URL feeds.

AusCERT is one of many computer emergency response teams (CERTs) and a member of FIRST, a worldwide network of computer security incident response and security teams. They are also a charter member of APCERT.

== AusCERT Annual Conference ==
AusCERT's conference for security professionals takes place every year. The conference program includes tutorials, networking activities, keynote speakers, and the Australian Information Security Awards.

In 2020, due to the COVID-19 pandemic, AusCERT hosted their first virtual conference. The conference MC was Adam Spencer, and featured speakers Julie Inman (eSafety Commission), Kana Shinoda (Code Blue), and Lukasz Gogolkiewicz (Seek).

== Additional Activities ==
The organisation currently supports and shares cybersecurity techniques openly with the following groups:

- The Australian Access Federation,
- Cyber Security threat annual surveys with BDO,
- International Training with APNIC,
- Training and support with KrCERT, and
- Council of Australian University Directors of Information Technology (CAUDIT).
