= Trusted Internet Connection =

2007 mandate of the US Office of Management and Budget

The Trusted Internet Connection initiative (also known as TIC, Office of Management and Budget (OMB) Memorandum M-08-05) is mandated in an OMB Memorandum issued in November 2007. The memorandum was meant to optimize individual external connections, including internet points of presence currently in use by the Federal government of the United States. It includes a program for improving the federal government’s incident response capability through a centralized gateway monitoring at a select group of TIC Access Providers (TICAP). By reducing the number of access points, the government could more easily monitor and identify potentially malicious traffic.

The initial goal for total number of federal external connections and internet points of presence was 50. General Services Administration Networx is the contract vehicle to implement this initiative.

== See also ==
- Trusted Network Connect
- DHS Cyber Infrastructure Trusted Internet Connections
