= Networx =

The GSA Networx is a set of federal government contracts for civilian telecommunication for the General Services Administration (GSA) in the United States. It consists of two programs - Networx Universal and Networx Enterprise to support the Trusted Internet Connection initiative by Office of Management and Budget.

Networx Universal is the large contract vehicle, and is expected to meet most of the governments requirements for telecommunications services. Its terms includes a 48-month base period plus three 24-month option periods. On March 29, 2007 three prime contractors were awarded on the Networx Universal contract: AT&T Government Solutions, Qwest Government Services, and Verizon Business Services. Sprint also submitted a bid but was not awarded any work under this contract.

Networx Enterprise is the smaller contract vehicle with a program ceiling of $20 billion.

GSA is now encouraging agencies to move from the Networx contract vehicle to a new one. From a recent report:

GSA is transitioning agencies from the . . . Networx contract, under which agencies purchased $1.79 billion in network and telecommunications services in fiscal year 2016, to a . . . contract vehicle called Enterprise Infrastructure Solutions (EIS). . .
The recently rescinded OMB Memorandum M-08-26, "Transition from FTS 2001 to Networx" stated that all agencies should use Networx to acquire telecommunications connectivity, including the option to purchase Trusted Internet Connections solutions from vendors as a managed service, called Managed Trusted Internet Protocol Services (MTIPS). As of July 2017, an OMB Memorandum mandating a similar use under the EIS contract does not exist. . .
EIS can [address] challenges faced by small agencies [which] struggle to attract and retain top information security personnel and often lack the expertise to fully manage their information security programs.
