= Kyl–Lieberman Amendment =

U.S Senate Ratified Law

- Long title: An act to express the sense of the Senate regarding Iran
- Enacted by: the 110th United States Congress

Codification
- Acts amended: H.R.1585

Legislative history
- Introduced in the Senate by Jon Kyl (R–AZ); Passed the Senate on (76–22)

The Kyl–Lieberman Amendment was an amendment to H.R.1585 – the National Defense Authorization Act for Fiscal Year 2008, which subsequently became a 2008 presidential election campaign issue. Its purpose was to "express the sense of the Senate regarding Iran", and mainly stated that: "it should be the policy of the United States to combat...the violent activities...inside Iraq of the Government of the Islamic Republic of Iran", and "its foreign facilitators such as Lebanese Hezbollah"; "to support the...use of all instruments of United States national power in Iraq...in support of the policy described"; and "with respect to the government of the Islamic Republic of Iran and its proxies", that the "United States should designate the Islamic Revolutionary Guards Corps as a foreign terrorist organization".

Barack Obama and John McCain did not vote on the measure in the Senate, which passed with a 76–22 vote, while Hillary Clinton voted in favor.
