= Gray Areas =

American quarterly magazine

Gray Areas was a quarterly magazine published from 1992 to 1995 by publisher Netta Gilboa. The magazine was based in Phoenix, Arizona. It won several awards including "One Of The Top Ten Magazines of 1992" by Library Journal. It discussed subcultures involving drugs (narcotics), phreaking, cyberpunk, pornography, the Grateful Dead and related issues. It only published 7 issues, but continues on as a website.

== Issue Contents ==
Issue 1 - Fall 1992 - Volume 1, No. 1 (84 pages)

- Interview: John Perry Barlow on computer crimes
- Interview: Kay Parker on the Adult Film Industry
- Tape History: Grateful Dead Live Video Tapes
- Interview: The Zen Tricksters Rock Band

Issue 2 - Spring 1993 - Volume 2, No. 1 (116 pages)

- Interview: Attorney/Musician Barry Melton
- Interview: Adult Film Director Candida Royalle
- Tape History: Little Feat Live Audio Tapes
- Tape History: Grateful Dead Bootleg CDs
- Things To Know About Urine Tests
- It's Later Than You Thought: Your 4th Amendment Rights
- Computer Privacy and the Common Man
- An Essay On The Fan-Artist Relationship
- My Pilgrimage To Jim Morrison's Grave
- Interview: Paul Quinn of the Soup Dragons

Issue 3 - Summer 1993 - Volume 2, No. 2 (132 pages)

- Interview: Musician GG Allin
- Interview: Grateful Dead Hour host David Gans
- Richard Pacheco on Adult Films
- Tape History: Jefferson Airplane Live Video Tapes
- Phone Phun Phenomena: Notes On The Prank Call Underground
- Interview: Prank Call Expert John Trubee
- Interview: Urnst Kouch, Computer Virus Writer
- Howard Stern Is Here To Stay
- Worlds At War, Pt. 1: The Gray Gods: A Theory of UFO Encounters

Issue 4 - Fall 1993 - Volume 2, No. 3 (148 pages)

- Interview: Ivan Stang of the Church of the SubGenius
- Interview: RIAA Piracy Director Steven D'Onofrio
- Interview: Phone Sex Fantasy Girl
- Review: Defcon I hackers convention
- Gray Travel: Amsterdam
- Confessions of an Amerikan LSD Eater
- Worlds At War, Pt. 2: The Ultimate Sin: UFO Conspiracies
- A Day With The KKK
- Run For Your Life: Why The Music Industry Wants You To Record Concerts
- Plagiarism: Thoughts on Sampling, Originality and Ownership
- Interview: Solar Circus Rock Band

Issue 5 - Spring 1994 - Volume 3, No. 1 (148 pages)

- Interview: Breaking Into The WELL
- Interview: S/M Dominatrix
- Paul Melka on computer viruses
- Review: Pumpcon II and HoHoCon IV hacker conventions
- Inside Today's Hacking Mind
- Interview: Phone Phreak
- Improving The Prison Environment
- Teenager Joins In The Fight Against AIDS
- Concealing My Identity: A Silence Imposed By Society
- All About Smart Drugs
- Lollapalooza 1993 Review
- Entertainment Industry Lawyers
- Deadheads and the Constitution
- Tape History: Jefferson Airplane Bootlegs
- Tape History: A Guide To Vintage Live Soul Tapes
- The New Music Seminar July 1993

Issue 6 - Fall 1994 - Volume 3, No. 2 (148 pages)

- Interview: Hacker/Phrack Publisher Erik Bloodaxe
- Interview: Adult Film Star Taylor Wane
- Review: Computers, Freedom and Privacy conference
- Stormbringer of Phalcon/Skism on computer virus writers
- A Cyberpunk Manifesto For The 90s
- Interview: Cable TV Thief
- True Cop, Blue Cop, Gray Cop
- Is Jury tampering A Crime?
- Interview: Folk Singer Melanie
- Jimi Hendrix: The Bootleg CDs
- Tape History: Big Brother and the Holding Company
- The Genitorturers Mean You Some Harm

Issue 7 - Spring 1995 - Volume 4, No. 1 (148 pages)

- Interview: Mike Gordon of Phish
- Interview: Internet Liberation Front
- Review: Defcon II, HoHoCon and HOPE hacker conventions
- Tape History: Jethro Tull Live Video Tapes
- Scanners: Tuning In Illegally On Phone Calls
- Confessions of an AIDS Activist
- Adventures In The Porn Store
- New Conflicts Over The Oldest Profession
- Two Thousand In Two Years: A Housewife Hooker's Story
- Psychoanalysis and Feminism
- Prozac: The Controversial Future of Psychopharmacology
- The Gray Area of Drug addiction
- The Art of Deception: Polygraph Lie Detection
- Voices of Adoptees: The Silent Society
- The Gray Art of John Wayne Gacy
- Lollapalooza 1994 Review
