= Everette Taylor =

American entrepreneur and public speaker

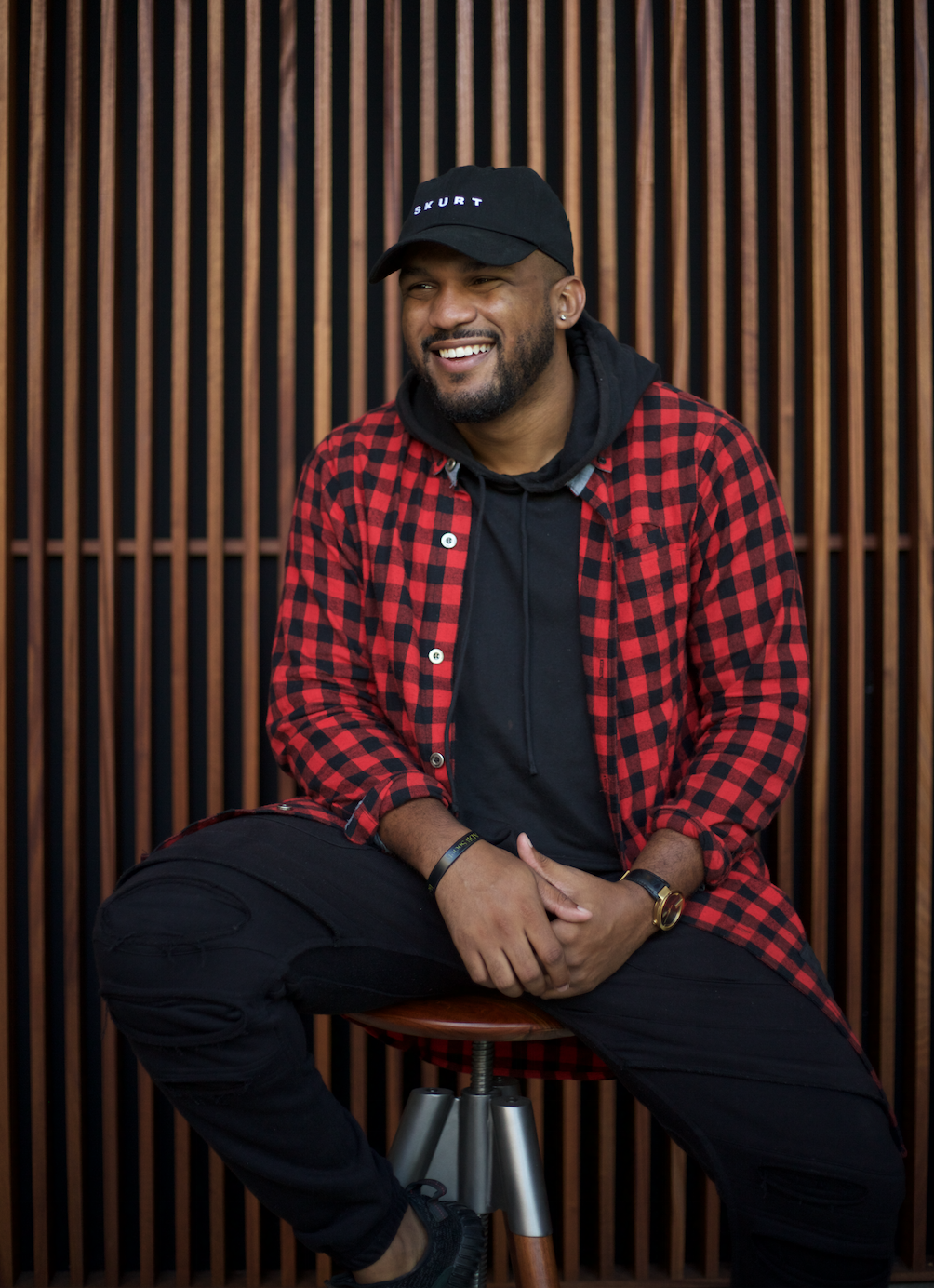
- Taylor in 2016
- Born: June 23, 1989 (age 37); Richmond, Virginia, U.S.
- Education: Virginia Tech
- Occupation: Business executive
- Website: www.everettetaylor.com

Everette Taylor (born June 23, 1989) is an American business executive. He has been the CEO of Kickstarter since September 2022, and was previously CMO of Artsy, and founder of ET Enterprises which includes the marketing firm MiliSense, social media software company PopSocial, ArtX, and GrowthHackers. Taylor was named one of Forbes' "30 Under 30" and has been widely recognized for his work at the intersection of technology, marketing, and culture.

== Early life ==
Taylor was born and raised in Richmond, Virginia. He attended Virginia Polytechnic Institute and State University after overcoming homelessness in high school. As a teenager, Taylor developed an early interest in entrepreneurship, launching small businesses including a clothing brand and a marketing hustle during high school. His experiences with poverty, dropping out of college, and being a self-taught marketer have shaped much of his focus on accessibility and diversity in tech.

== Career ==
At the age of 19, Taylor started an event marketing software company called Eventuosity, which was sold two years later. After dropping out of college, he became the VP of marketing at Qualaroo, a behavioral insight software company, which was later acquired by Xenon Ventures in 2014. With Sean Ellis, Taylor co-founded GrowthHackers, an online growth hacking community and software as a service (SaaS). He helped build the brand into a central hub for startup growth professionals.

In 2013, Taylor launched the clothing line Unity Over Self with NFL athlete Brandian Ross to raise money for children with autism.

In 2016, he founded PopSocial, a social media marketing software company that served clients such as Microsoft and NASA.

In 2018, he founded ET Enterprises, a holding company that oversees his various business ventures. That same year, he partnered with actress Zoe Saldaña to launch the media platform BESE, and he also co-founded Hayver, an app focused on drug and alcohol addiction prevention.

In September 2022, he was appointed as CEO of Kickstarter.

== Recognition ==
Black Enterprise Magazine named Taylor "Social Media Influencer of the Year" in 2016.

The following year, he was included in The Root’s Root 100 list of the most influential African Americans.

In 2017, he was named a brand ambassador for NASA's Technology Transfer Program to advocate for the commercialization of NASA technologies within the startup and marketing communities.

In 2018, he made the Forbes 30 Under 30 list for his work in marketing and advertising with PopSocial.

That same year, he was also featured in Adweek’s Young Influentials list, which spotlights rising leaders in marketing, media, and tech.

== Philanthropy ==
Taylor supports diversity and gender equality initiatives such as CODE2040, Wonder Women Tech, and Black Girls Code.
