= Chris Valasek =

American cyber security professional (born 1982)

- Born: June 2, 1982 (age 44); Ford City, Pennsylvania, USA
- Education: University of Pittsburgh
- Known for: Summercon Organizer, Automotive Hacking
- Scientific career
- Fields: Computer Science

Chris Valasek was a Senior Director with General Motors, and was formerly a computer security researcher with Cruise Automation, a self-driving car startup previously owned by GM.

== Career ==
Prior to his current employment, he worked for:

- Cruise (autonomous vehicle)
- IOActive
- Coverity
- Accuvant
- IBM

== Education ==
Valasek holds a Bachelors in Computer Science from University of Pittsburgh. He currently lives in Pittsburgh, Pennsylvania.

== Security Research ==
=== Microsoft Windows ===
Valasek has publicly demonstrated many security vulnerabilities, with particular focus on Microsoft Windows heap exploitation.

His 2009 presentation "Practical Windows XP/2003 Heap Exploitation" at Black Hat presented a novel approach to gaining elevated access in a Windows environment.

Later research, such as his 2010 paper "Understanding the Low Fragmentation Heap: From Allocation to Exploitation" demonstrated ways to circumvent vendor mitigations to the approaches outlined in his prior work.

=== Automotive Security ===
In 2013, he and Charlie Miller demonstrating a number of attack vectors against ECUs in automotive control networks. Together with Miller, they have produced a survey of remote attack surfaces in then-current model year automobiles, an important first step in establishing the state of the art of automotive security and safety research.

=== Summercon ===
Chris has been involved with the conference as part of the Summercon planning committee since 2003. He is currently listed as Chairman Emeritus on the Summercon Organizer page.
