= Dion Foxx =

American football player (born 1971)

No. 57, 56
- Position: Linebacker

Personal information
- Born: June 11, 1971 (age 55); Richmond, Virginia, U.S.
- Listed height: 6 ft 3 in (1.91 m)
- Listed weight: 250 lb (113 kg)

Career information
- College: James Madison
- NFL draft: 1994: undrafted

Career history
- Miami Dolphins (1994–1995); Washington Redskins (1995); Saskatchewan Roughriders (1998); Houston Marshals (2000); Birmingham Thunderbolts (2001)
- Stats at Pro Football Reference

Dion Lamont Foxx (born June 11, 1971) is an American former professional football player who was a linebacker in the National Football League (NFL). He played college football for the James Madison Dukes. Foxx played in the NFL for the Miami Dolphins, the Washington Redskins, and the Green Bay Packers. His pro career also included stints in the Canadian Football League, Spring Football League and XFL.

Foxx began as a stand out player at Meadowbrook High School. Foxx went on to become a dominant linebacker at James Madison University. In recent years, he has taught at the middle school and high school levels, and coaches high school football. Foxx is currently the Athletic Director at George Wythe High School in Richmond, Virginia. He is also a member of Omega Psi Phi fraternity.
