= John Graves (American football) =

American football player (born 1987)

No. 91
- Position: Defensive tackle

Personal information
- Born: June 25, 1987 (age 39); Richmond, Virginia, U.S.
- Listed height: 6 ft 3 in (1.91 m)
- Listed weight: 286 lb (130 kg)

Career information
- High school: North Chesterfield (VA) Meadowbrook
- College: Virginia Tech
- NFL draft: 2011: undrafted

Career history
- Houston Texans (2011)*; Seattle Seahawks (2011–2012)*
- * Offseason or practice squad member only

Awards and highlights
- Second-team All-ACC (2010)
- Stats at Pro Football Reference

John Walter Graves Jr. (born June 25, 1987) is an American former football defensive tackle who played with the Seattle Seahawks.

== Early life ==
Graves attended Meadowbrook High School, where he was selected to the All-America team by PrepStar and SuperPrep.

== College career ==
Graves played under Frank Beamer at Virginia Tech for five seasons from 2006 to 2010. Though he initially played at defensive tackle, during the 2009 offseason, coaches Charley Wiles and Bud Foster moved him to defensive end, where he played during his fifth season. Graves was a captain as a senior. Though Graves was regarded by teammates as being somewhat wild, he was described by coach Charley Wiles as being a natural leader and one of a strong work ethic. After Tech's loss to James Madison in 2010, Graves was immediately back in the film room getting ready for the next game.

== Professional career ==
Graves was not selected in the 2011 NFL draft, but was signed by the Seattle Seahawks as an undrafted free agent. He was waived during final cuts, but did come back to the team on the practice squad for the 2011 season. He was subsequently waived.

== Personal life ==
Graves has wife named Sam.
