= Brandian Ross =

American football player and scout (born 1989)

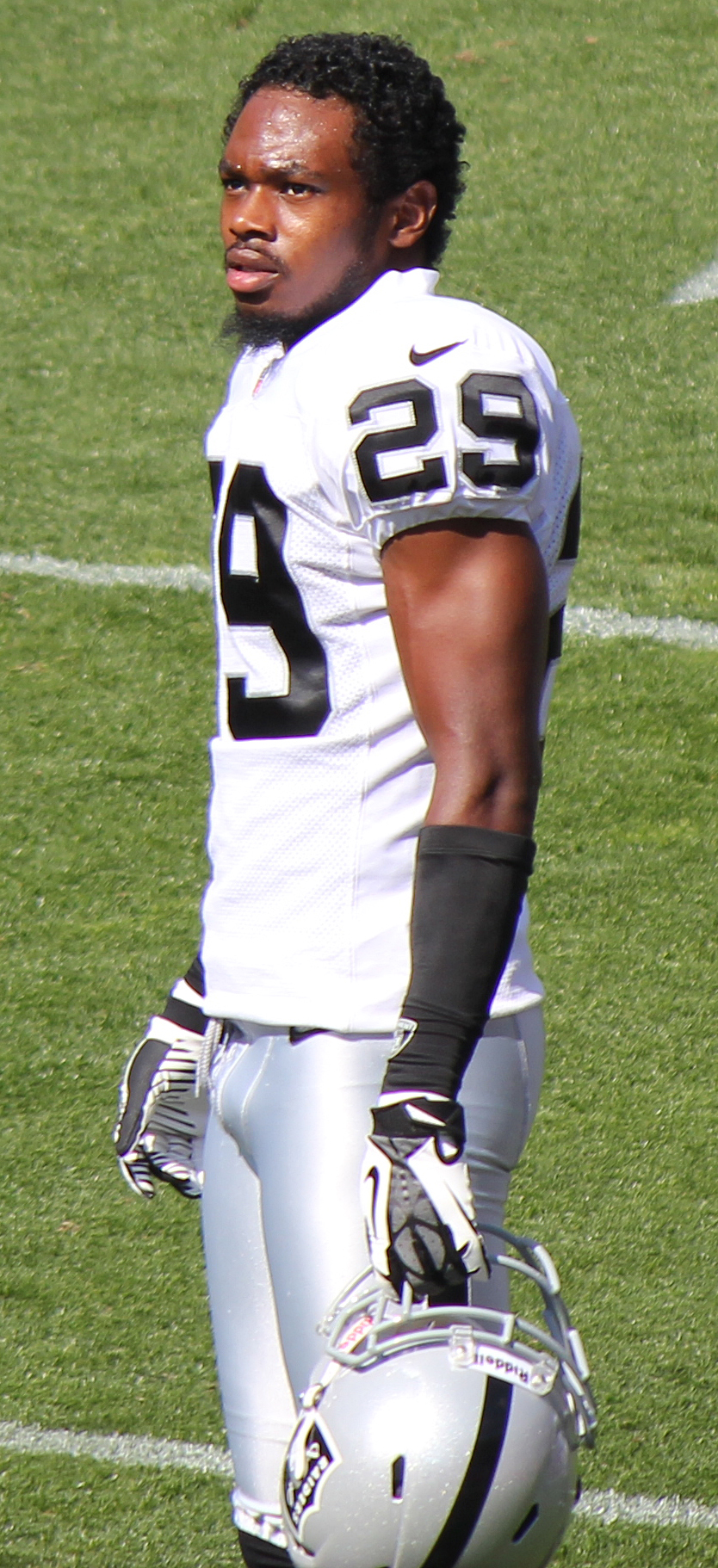
- Ross with the Oakland Raiders in 2012

No. 27, 29, 33
- Position: Safety

Personal information
- Born: September 28, 1989 (age 37); Richmond, Virginia, U.S.
- Listed height: 6 ft 0 in (1.83 m)
- Listed weight: 191 lb (87 kg)

Career information
- High school: Meadowbrook
- College: Youngstown State (2007–2010)
- NFL draft: 2011: undrafted

Career history
- Green Bay Packers (2011–2012); Oakland Raiders (2012–2013); Miami Dolphins (2014); Oakland Raiders (2014–2015); San Diego Chargers (2015); Denver Broncos (2016)*
- * Offseason or practice squad member only

Career NFL statistics
- Total tackles: 150
- Sacks: 2
- Forced fumbles: 2
- Pass deflections: 9
- Interceptions: 2
- Stats at Pro Football Reference

Brandian Ross (born September 28, 1989) is an American former professional football player who was a safety in the National Football League (NFL). He played college football for the Youngstown State Penguins and was signed by the Green Bay Packers as an undrafted free agent in 2011, and by the Oakland Raiders in 2012. After his playing career, he became a scout for the Packers.

== College career ==
Ross played at the collegiate level at Youngstown State University. He played safety his first three seasons before he switched to cornerback. Ross recorded in 45 games played (33 starts), had 223 total tackles (135 solos and 88 assists), had seven interceptions, three fumble recoveries and two forced fumbles.

== Professional career ==
=== Green Bay Packers ===
Ross signed with the Green Bay Packers in July 2011 as an undrafted rookie and spent that season on practice squad. Ross wound up again on Green Bay's practice squad in 2012 season after the Packers waived him at the end of training camp. When Reggie McKenzie offered him a spot on the Oakland Raiders 53-man roster on September 19, Ross didn't hesitate to sign.

=== Oakland Raiders ===
On September 19, 2012, Ross was signed by the Oakland Raiders.

=== Miami Dolphins ===
On August 31, 2014, Ross was claimed off waivers by the Miami Dolphins. He was waived on September 23, 2014.

=== Oakland Raiders (second stint) ===
Ross was claimed off waivers by the Oakland Raiders from the Miami Dolphins on September 24, 2014. On December 7 on the first play against the 49ers he intercepted Colin Kaepernick for his first interception of his career.

On September 5, 2015, the Raiders placed Ross on injured reserve.

=== San Diego Chargers ===
Ross signed with the San Diego Chargers on December 30, 2015.

=== Denver Broncos ===
On April 18, 2016, Ross signed a one-year contract with the Denver Broncos. He was released on August 29, 2016.

== NFL career statistics ==
Legend
**Bold**	Career high

Year	Team	Games		Tackles					Interceptions					Fumbles			
Year	Team	GP	GS	Cmb	Solo	Ast	Sck	TFL	Int	Yds	TD	Lng	PD	FF	FR	Yds	TD
2012	OAK	14	1	20	17	3	0.0	**3**	0	0	0	0	0	0	0	0	0
2013	OAK	**16**	**13**	**75**	**56**	**19**	**2.0**	1	0	0	0	0	3	**1**	0	0	0
2014	MIA	1	0	0	0	0	0.0	0	0	0	0	0	0	0	0	0	0
2014	OAK	13	10	55	40	15	0.0	1	**2**	**7**	0	**7**	**6**	**1**	0	0	0
2015	SDG	1	0	0	0	0	0.0	0	0	0	0	0	0	0	0	0	0
		45	24	150	113	37	2.0	5	2	7	0	7	9	2	0	0	0

== Scouting career ==
Ross became a scouting intern for Packers in 2017 and was promoted to a full-time position in 2018.

== Philanthropy ==
In 2013, Ross launched the clothing line Unity Over Self to help raise money for children with autism with Everette Taylor.
