= Morgan Moses =

American football player (born 1991)

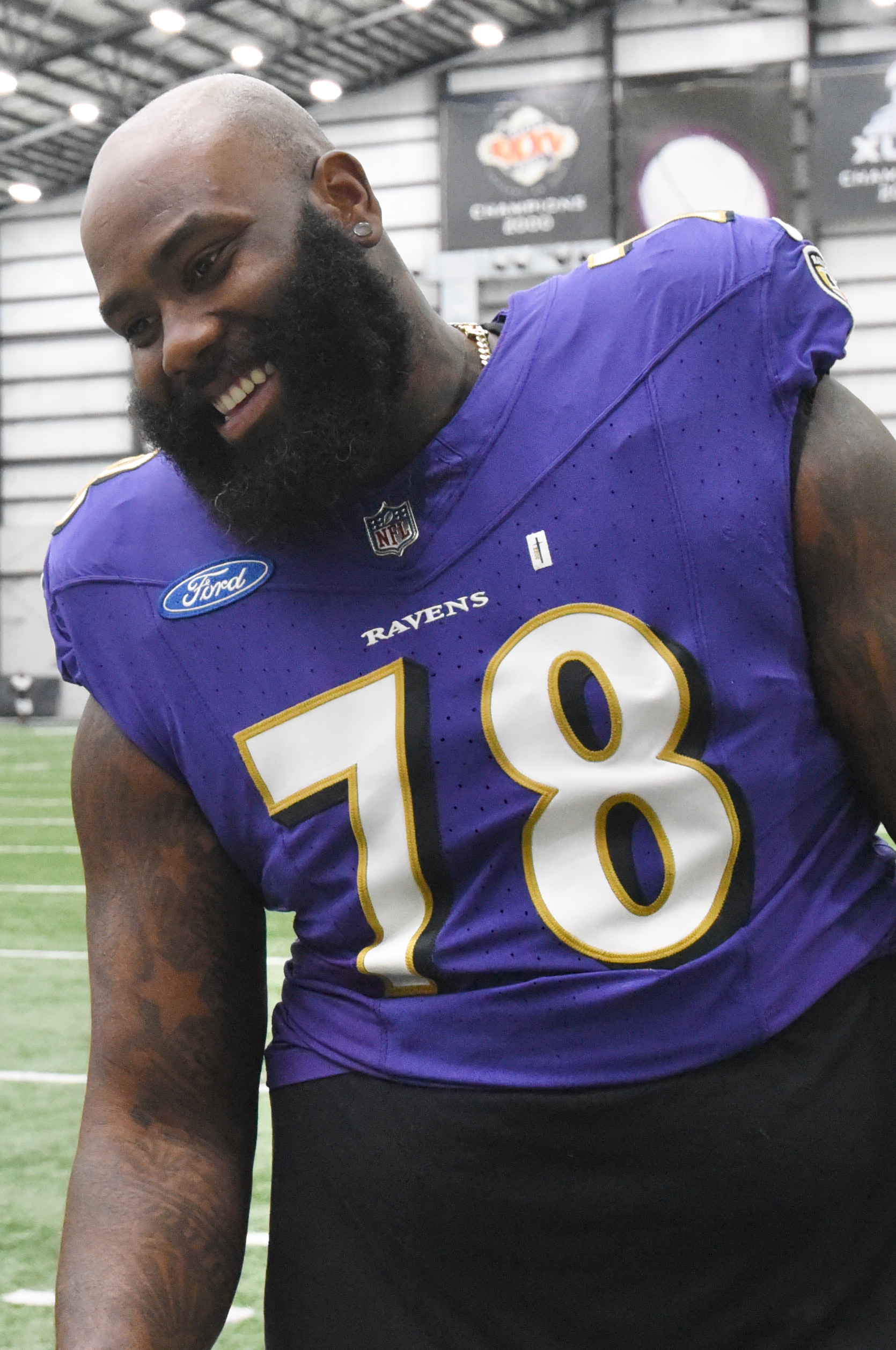
- Moses with the Baltimore Ravens in 2023

No. 76 – New England Patriots
- Position: Offensive tackle
- Roster status: Active

Personal information
- Born: March 3, 1991 (age 35); Richmond, Virginia, U.S.
- Listed height: 6 ft 6 in (1.98 m)
- Listed weight: 320 lb (145 kg)

Career information
- High school: Meadowbrook (Chesterfield, Virginia)
- College: Virginia (2010–2013)
- NFL draft: 2014: 3rd round, 66th overall pick

Career history
- Washington Redskins / Football Team (2014–2020); New York Jets (2021); Baltimore Ravens (2022–2023); New York Jets (2024); New England Patriots (2025–present)

Awards and highlights
- Third-team All-ACC (2013)

Career NFL statistics as of Week 1, 2026
- Games played: 184
- Games started: 176
- Stats at Pro Football Reference

Morgan Moses (born March 3, 1991) is an American professional football offensive tackle for the New England Patriots of the National Football League (NFL). He played college football for the Virginia Cavaliers and was selected by the Washington Redskins in the third round of the 2014 NFL draft. He has also played for the New York Jets and Baltimore Ravens.

== Early life and college ==
Moses attended Meadowbrook High School in North Chesterfield, Virginia where he was a two-time all-state, all-region and all-district selection. After originally committing to Virginia, he played one year of prep football at Fork Union Military Academy in order to become academically qualified to attend the University of Virginia to play for the Virginia Cavaliers.

Moses started all 12 games at left tackle during his senior year with the Cavaliers, finishing his career with 43 starts. He earned third-team All-Atlantic Coast Conference (ACC) honors. He graduated from UVA with degrees in anthropology and African American studies.

== Professional career ==
Pre-draft measurables
| Height | Weight | Arm length | Hand span | Wingspan | 40-yard dash | 10-yard split | 20-yard split | 20-yard shuttle | Three-cone drill | Vertical jump | Broad jump |
|---|---|---|---|---|---|---|---|---|---|---|---|
| 6 ft 6 in (1.98 m) | 314 lb (142 kg) | 35 3/8 in (0.90 m) | 9 7/8 in (0.25 m) | 7 ft 0 5/8 in (2.15 m) | 5.20 s | 1.86 s | 3.03 s | 4.95 s | 7.93 s | 26.0 in (0.66 m) | 8 ft 11 in (2.72 m) |
All values from NFL Combine/Virginia Pro Day

=== Washington Redskins / Football Team ===
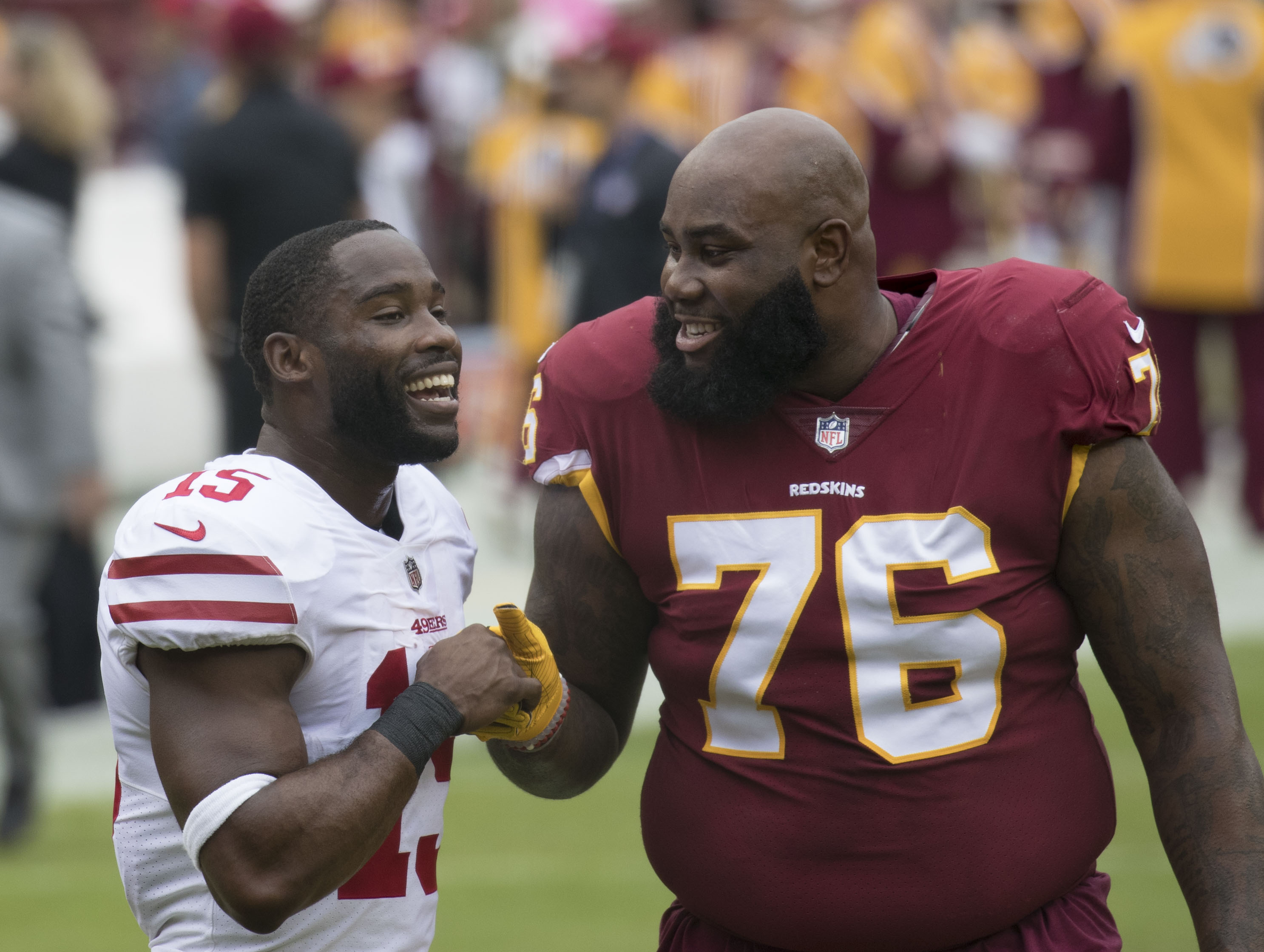
Moses (right) and former teammate Pierre Garcon in 2017

Moses was selected by the Washington Redskins in the third round (66th overall) of the 2014 NFL draft. He signed a four-year, $3.05 million contract on May 29, 2014. He started only one game that season and was placed on injured reserve that December because of a lisfranc injury.

During training camp of his second season in 2015, Moses won the starting right tackle job despite initial belief that new first round draft pick, Brandon Scherff, would win the job. Scherff instead became the starting right guard. On April 27, 2017, Moses signed a five-year contract extension with the Redskins.

In Week 10 of the 2020 season, Moses filled in at left tackle after Cornelius Lucas left in the second half of the game with an injury. The following week, Moses switched over and started at left tackle in the win against the Cincinnati Bengals. In Week 13, Moses returned to playing right tackle after Lucas was able to return. He was released on May 20, 2021.

=== New York Jets (first stint) ===
Moses signed a one-year, $3.6 million deal with the New York Jets on July 2, 2021.

=== Baltimore Ravens ===
On March 16, 2022, Moses signed a three-year, $15 million contract with the Baltimore Ravens.

=== New York Jets (second stint) ===
On March 13, 2024, Moses and a fourth-round pick were traded to the New York Jets for a fourth (originally acquired from the Denver Broncos) and a sixth-round pick.

=== New England Patriots ===
On March 13, 2025, Moses signed a three-year, $24 million contract with the New England Patriots. He started in Super Bowl LX, a 29–13 loss to the Seattle Seahawks.

== NFL career statistics ==
Legend
| **Bold** | Career high |

=== Regular season ===
| Year | Team | Games | | Offense | | | | | |
| Year | Team | GP | GS | Snaps | Pct | Holding | False start | Decl/Pen | Acpt/Pen |
|---|---|---|---|---|---|---|---|---|---|
| 2014 | WAS | 8 | 1 | 126 | 24% | 0 | 1 | 0 | 1 |
| 2015 | WAS | 16 | 16 | 1,030 | 96% | 5 | 2 | **4** | 9 |
| 2016 | WAS | 16 | 16 | 1,017 | 96% | 3 | 3 | 1 | 7 |
| 2017 | WAS | 16 | 16 | 958 | 95% | 1 | 3 | 0 | 5 |
| 2018 | WAS | 16 | 16 | 965 | 95% | **6** | **7** | 2 | **14** |
| 2019 | WAS | 16 | 16 | 857 | 91% | 4 | 5 | 1 | 9 |
| 2020 | WAS | 16 | 16 | **1,065** | **98%** | 2 | 2 | 1 | 6 |
| 2021 | NYJ | 17 | 16 | 1,020 | 94% | 0 | 2 | 0 | 3 |
| 2022 | BAL | 17 | 17 | 1,024 | 93% | 1 | 4 | 1 | 8 |
| 2023 | BAL | 14 | 14 | 779 | 84% | 0 | 4 | 2 | 4 |
| 2024 | NYJ | 14 | 14 | 723 | 67.7% | 3 | 3 | 1 | 7 |
| | | 166 | 158 | 9,564 | 84.8% | 25 | 36 | 13 | 74 |
