= Meadowbrook High School (Chesterfield County, Virginia) =

Public high school in Virginia, US

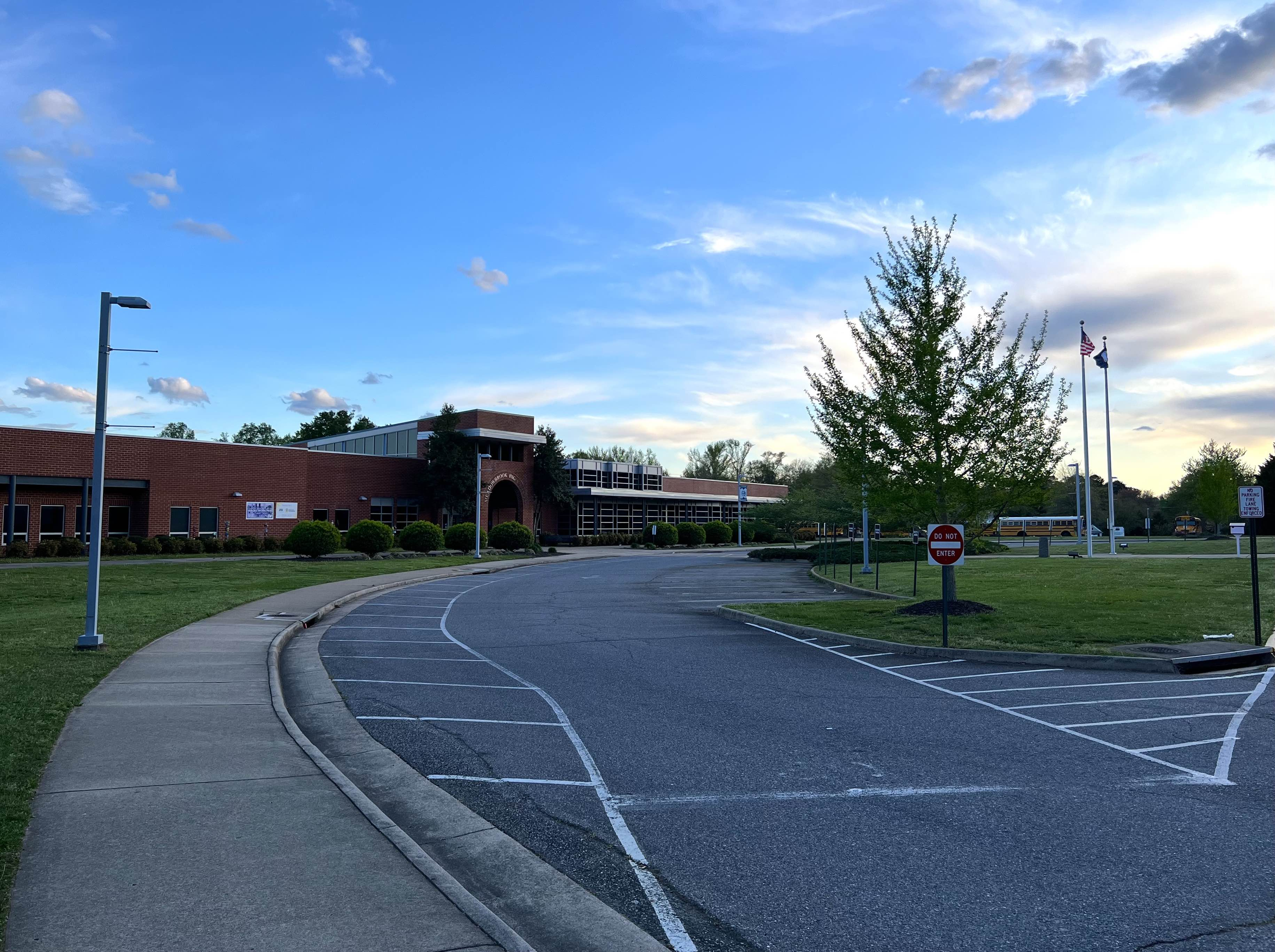
- Exterior view of Meadowbrook High School in 2024.

Location
- 4901 Cogbill Road; North Chesterfield, Virginia 23234; United States; 37°26′7.5″N 77°29′0″W

Information
- Type: Public
- Opened: September 1963
- School district: Chesterfield County Public Schools
- Superintendent: John Murray
- Principal: Craig Reed
- Teaching staff: 148.01 (FTE)
- Grades: 9–12
- Enrollment: 1,953 (2024–25)
- Student to teacher ratio: 13.20
- Campus type: Suburban
- Colors: Navy Blue and Gold
- Athletics conference: Virginia High School League; Conference 12; Central District
- Team name: Monarchs
- Rival: L. C. Bird High School; Manchester High School
- Feeder schools: Falling Creek Middle School; Manchester Middle School
- Specialty centers: International Baccalaureate (IB); Meadowbrook Academy for Developing Entrepreneurs (M.A.D.E.)
- Website: Official website

Meadowbrook High School is a high school located in Chesterfield County, Virginia. The school is home to an International Baccalaureate Program and Meadowbrook's Academy for Developing Entrepreneurs (M.A.D.E.). The school has one of the most diverse student bodies in the state and region with students representing over 60 nations.

== History ==
The school originally was given the name Central High School.

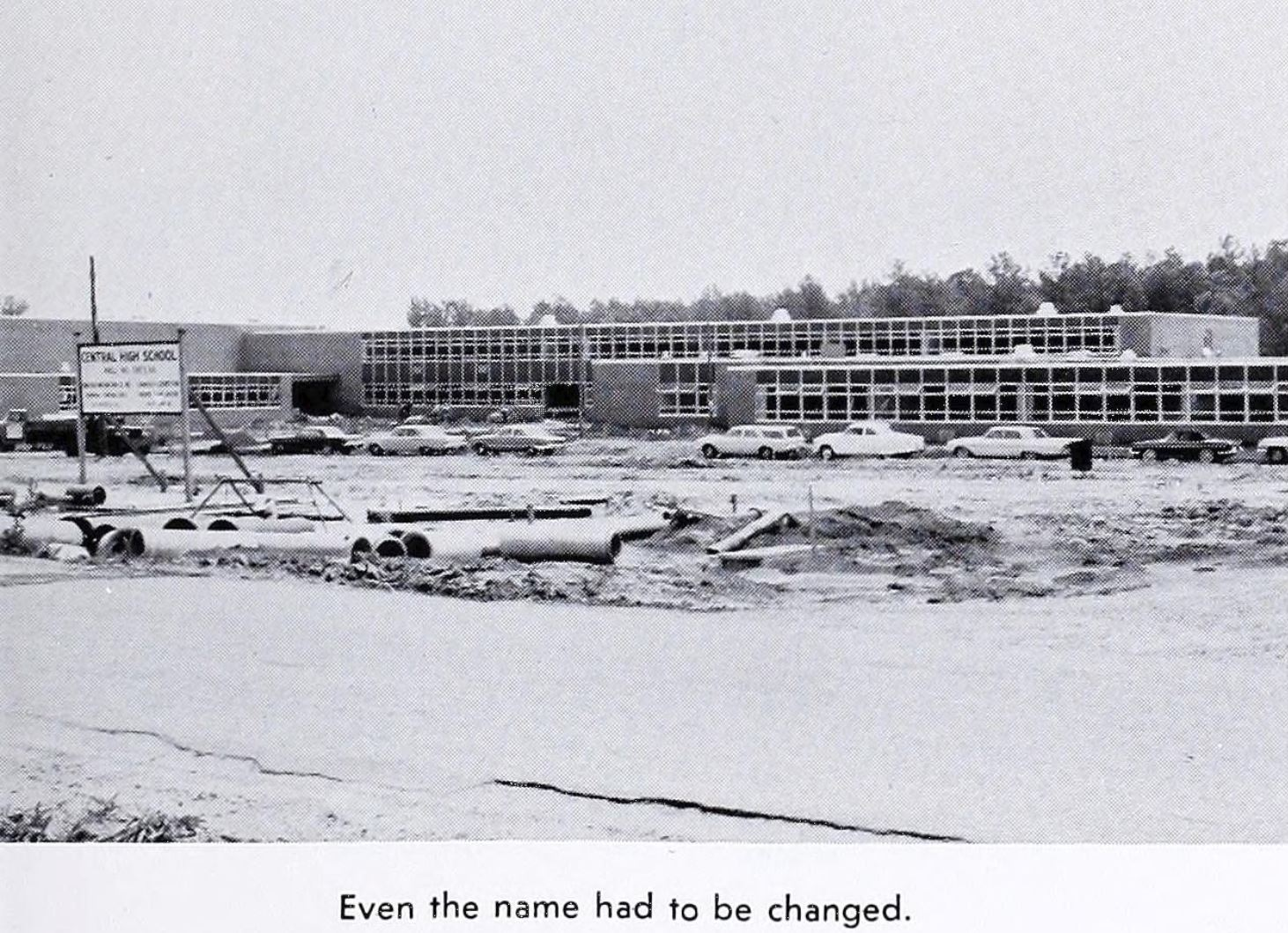
Central High School on the construction sign

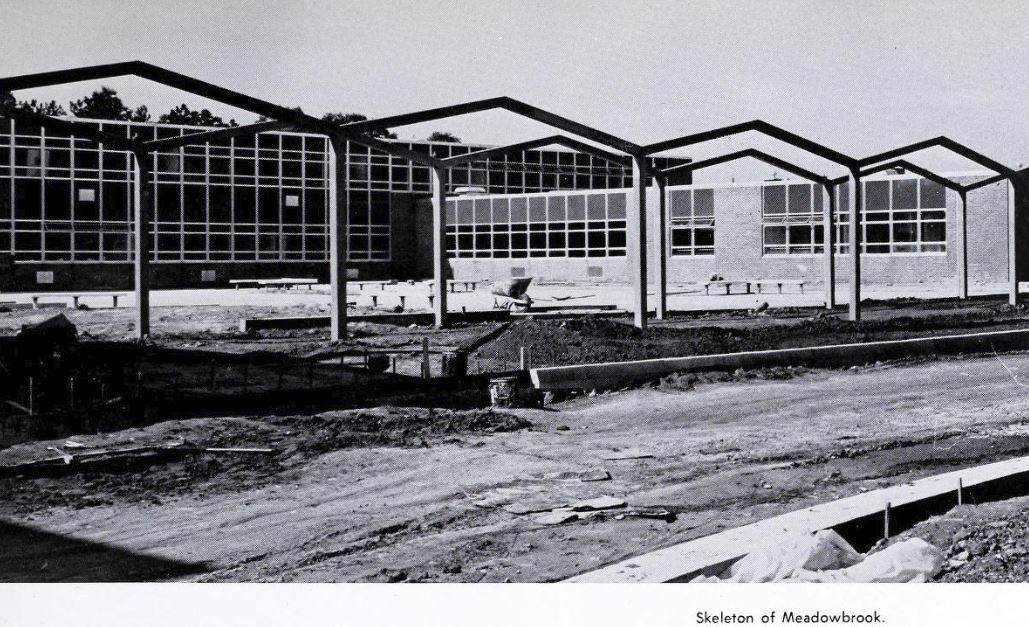
Meadowbrook High School under construction

Meadowbrook High School opened in September 1963. The first students were from the Manchester High and Thomas Dale High districts.

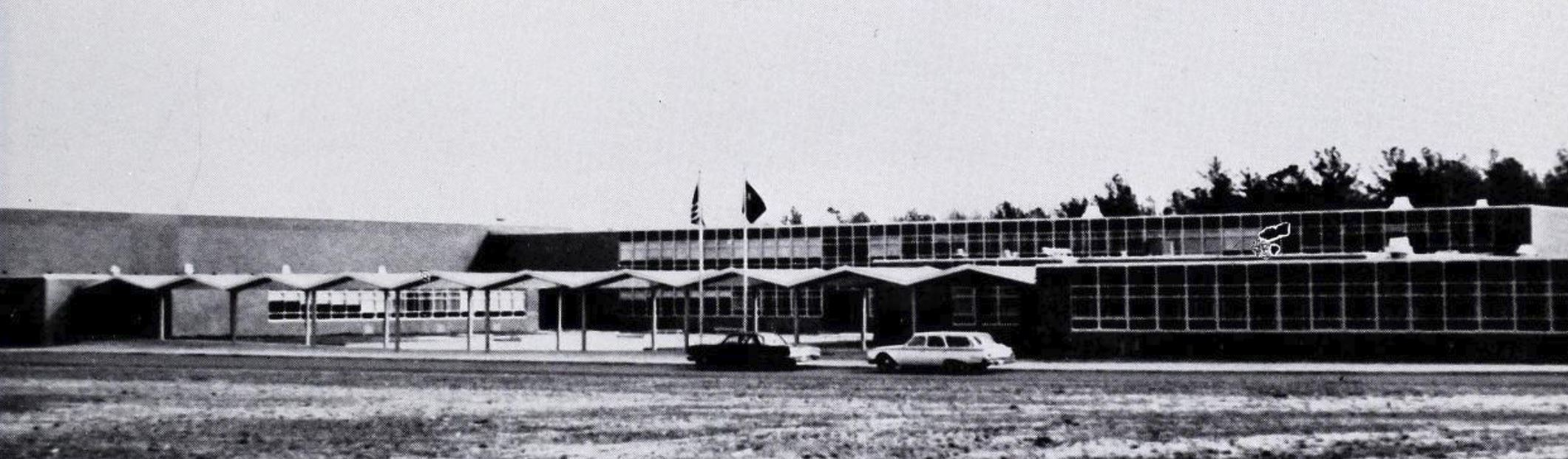
Original Building completed facing Cogbill Road

The school was renovated and expanded in 2001; the design work was done by local architect firm BCHW.

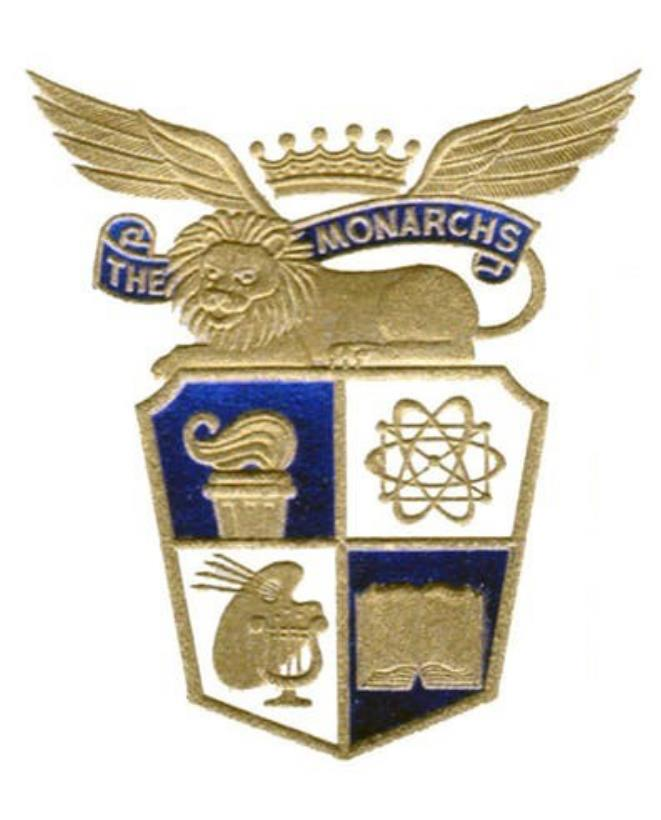
Meadowbrook High School Seal

== School ==
=== Accreditation ===
Meadowbrook High School is accredited by the Virginia Department of Education.

=== Demographics ===
Virginia Department of Education (School Quality Profiles)
	2015-16	2016-17	2017-18	2018-19	2019–20
Grade 9	458	519	514	468	610
Grade 10	443	458	500	488	445
Grade 11	378	382	407	443	432
Grade 12	372	361	382	384	433
Total Students	1,651	1,720	1,803	1,783	1,920
African American	55.2%	50.5%	46.8%	48.1%	44.69%
Asian American	2.6%	3.1%	2.4%	2.1%	1.82%
Hispanic American (of any race)	30.8%	35.0%	40.1%	39.5%	43.75%
Multiracial	2.9%	7.7%	3.0%	2.9%	2.97%
Native American	0.2%	0.3%	1.3%	0.1%	0.10%
Non-Hispanic White	7.9%	7.7%	7.4%	7.2%	6.56%

== Speciality Centers ==
=== International Baccalaureate (IB) ===
Established in January 1999, The International Baccalaureate aims to develop inquiring, knowledgeable and caring young people who help to create a better and more peaceful world through intercultural understanding and respect. To this end the organization works with schools, governments and international organizations to develop challenging programs of international education and rigorous assessment. These programs encourage students across the world to become active, compassionate and lifelong learners who understand that other people, with their differences, can also be right.

=== Meadowbrook Academy for Developing Entrepreneurship (M.A.D.E.) ===
Established in 2015, the Meadowbrook Academy for Developing Entrepreneurship promotes entrepreneurship in high school students. The program links students with mentors and resources in the Richmond entrepreneurial space.

== Athletics ==
=== Mascot ===
As a student body, the students chose the colors navy blue and gold to represent the school. Manchester High School's mascot is the Lancers and Thomas Dale High School's mascot is the Knights, but Meadowbrook High chose the mighty Monarch as it made the students feel strong. In an effort to stand out among the schools, the roar of the lion was used as the mascot for pep rallies and sporting events.

Between 1964 and 1975, prowling along the sidelines was a real lion that would be at pep rallies and games.

=== Rivalries ===
Meadowbrook maintains two traditional rivals in all sports with the L.C. Bird High School Skyhawks and the Manchester High School Lancers. Meadowbrook has long-standing rivalries with several Central District foes.

=== Athletic Facilities ===
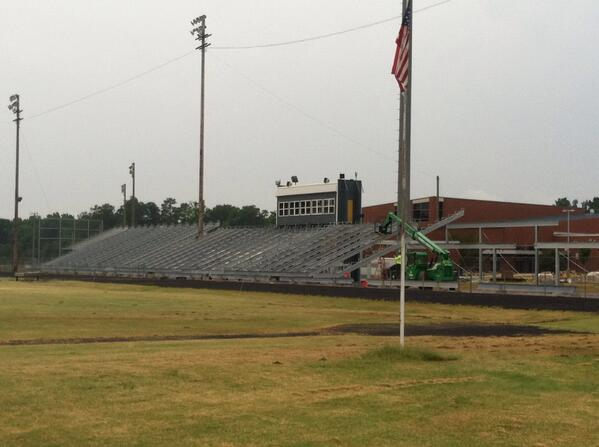
Mack D. Moore Stadium under construction in 2014

Mack D. Moore Stadium is the home field to the Monarchs football, Men's and Women's Soccer, Men's and Women's Track and Field and Field Hockey teams. The Stadium received major renovation in 2014, with a new home and away stands increasing capacity and adding ADA compliant bleachers for all fans and spectators to enjoy home games. The field is surrounded by a rubber track installed in 2006. Brian D. Kane Gymnasium is named after wrestling coach Brian Kane and is home to the Men's and Women's Basketball and Wrestling team home games and matches. The Baseball Team plays their home games adjacent to Mack D. Moore Stadium. The Softball team plays their home games at the softball field on campus. All teams benefit from Strength and Training Facility at the lower level of the school.

=== Baseball ===
Meadowbrook has produced two players that have gone on to have successful professional baseball careers in Major League Baseball. Johnny Grubb was a member of the 1984 Detroit Tigers World Series team and Cla Meredith (2001).

=== Men's Basketball ===
On March 12, 1994, the Meadowbrook Monarchs defeated the William Fleming High School Colonels of Roanoke, Virginia in the 1994 VHSL AAA State Championship Game 70–65. The Monarchs compiled a 28–2 record on the season and were ranked number 1 in the state for the majority of the 1993–94 season. They became the first school from Chesterfield County to win a state championship in men's Basketball. The 1993–94 team was coached by Mike Sutton he left at the end of the season to become an assistant coach at Tulsa Golden Hurricane men's basketball.

Several players have gone on to play collegiate basketball the most notable player Justin Harper went on to play for the university of Richmond Spiders and was selected 32nd overall of the 2011 NBA draft by the Cleveland Cavaliers, who subsequently traded his draft rights to the Orlando Magic.

=== Football ===
The Monarchs made their first post-season appearance in 1989. After a playoff drought of 14 years, the Monarchs returned to the postseason in 2003, being eliminated by eventual state champions Hopewell High School (Virginia) Blue Devils in the Central Regional championship. The following season the Monarchs returning a core of seniors eventually were crowned Group AAA, Division 5 State Champions in 2004. Meadowbrook went on to win the Virginia High School Football Championship by defeating North Stafford High School Wolverines 35–27, at the University of Richmond Stadium. The Meadowbrook Monarchs were the first school in Chesterfield County to win a state championship in football. The 2004 team finished the season ranked 3rd in the state and 151st in the nation.

Several players have gone on to play collegiate football with four notable alumni Dion Foxx (1989), John Graves (2006), Brandian Ross (2007), and Morgan Moses (2010) moving on to play professionally in the National Football League. Lavonte Hights who was also an alumni at Meadowbrook (2013), was invited to the Chicago Bears rookie minicamp in 2018 after a successful collegiate career at Shepherd University. He then shortly after signed to play with the Salt Lake Stallions of the now defunct Alliance of American Football in which he played the first and only season of the league.

=== Golf ===
Meadowbrook Monarchs won its first state title in 1966 and again in 1980. The School has two state runner-up titles in 1967 and 1976. Several state champions as individuals have been crowned.

Meadowbrook produced John Rollins, Lanny, and Bobby Wadkins all went on to play in the Professional Golfers Association PGA after successful collegiate careers.

=== Men's Soccer ===
The Men's Soccer team have been crowned District and Conference champions in 1989 and 2017.

=== Men's Track and Field ===
Multiple athletes have been crowned individual champions in outdoor and indoor track in different events.

=== Women's Track and Field ===
Women's Track and Field has had great success and in 1990 were state runners-up to Lake Braddock High School in indoor track. Multiple athletes have been crowned individual champions in outdoor and indoor track in different events.

=== Wrestling ===
Multiple wrestlers have been crowned individual champions in different weight classes. The gym is named in honor of longtime wrestling coach Brian Kane. The school produced two state champions under Kane's leadership. Frank Nicklis was the 145-pound champion in 1991 and Dan Austin was the 135-pound champion in 1992.

== Notable alumni ==
Alum	Notability
Dion Foxx	Former NFL linebacker, Miami Dolphins, Washington Redskins
Johnny Grubb	Former MLB outfielder, 1974 Major League Baseball All-Star game and 1984 World Series Champion
Cla Meredith	MLB pitcher (Baltimore Orioles)
John Rollins	PGA Tour golfer
Bobby Wadkins	former PGA Tour golfer
Lanny Wadkins	former PGA Tour golfer
Justin Harper	NBA player (Orlando Magic)
John Graves	Former NFL player, Houston Texans and Seattle Seahawks
Brandian Ross	Former NFL defensive back, Oakland Raiders, Green Bay Packers, San Diego Chargers, Denver Broncos and Miami Dolphins
Morgan Moses	NFL Offensive Lineman (New York Jets)
Aaron Zebley	Former Chief of Staff (FBI)
Bambadjan Bamba	Actor
Tony Pham	Prosecutor, former acting director of U.S. Immigration and Customs Enforcement
