= Alexander Sotirov =

Computer security researcher

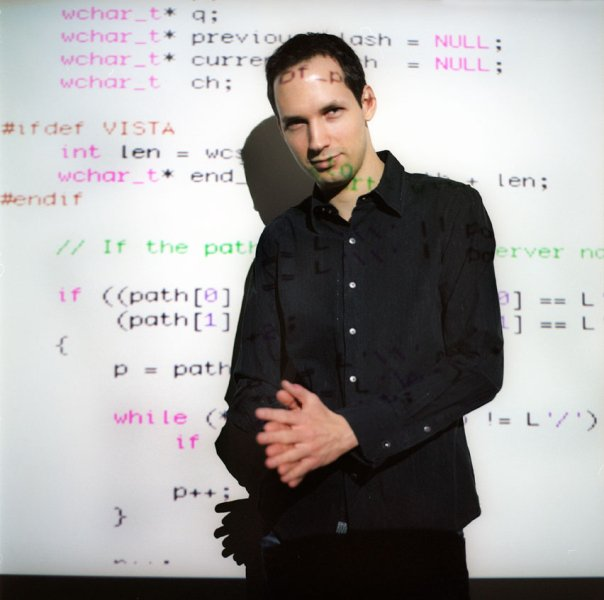
- Alexander Sotirov
- Born: Sofia, Bulgaria
- Other name: Alex Sotirov
- Citizenship: United States, Bulgaria
- Education: University of Alabama
- Known for: Pwnie award organizer, Black Hat Briefings Review Board Member
- Scientific career
- Fields: Computer Science

Alexander Sotirov is a computer security researcher. He has been employed by Determina and VMware. In 2012, Sotirov co-founded New York-based cybersecurity consultancy Trail of Bits with Dino Dai Zovi and Dan Guido, where he currently serves as co-CEO.

He is well known for his discovery of the ANI browser vulnerability, as well as, the so-called Heap Feng Shui technique for exploiting heap buffer overflows in browsers. In 2008, he presented research at Black Hat showing how to bypass memory protection safeguards in Windows Vista. Together with a team of industry security researchers and academic cryptographers, he published research on creating a rogue certificate authority by using collisions of the MD5 cryptographic hash function in December 2008.

Sotirov is a founder and organizer of the Pwnie awards, was on the program committee of the 2008 Workshop On Offensive Technologies (WOOT '08), and has served on the Black Hat Review Board since 2011.
