= Summercon =

Hacker conventions

- Status: Active
- Genre: Hacker con
- Frequency: Annually
- Country: United States
- Inaugurated: 1987; 39 years ago
- Most recent: 2024
- Sponsors: Capsule8 Trail of Bits
- Website: www.summercon.org

Summercon is one of the oldest hacker conventions, and America's oldest and longest-running information security conference. It helped set a precedent for more modern "cons" such as H.O.P.E. and DEF CON, although it has remained smaller and more personal. Summercon has been hosted in cities such as Pittsburgh, St. Louis, Atlanta, Washington, D.C., New York City, Austin, Las Vegas, and Amsterdam. Originally run by Phrack, the underground ezine, and held annually in St. Louis, the organizational responsibilities of running Summercon were transferred to clovis in 1998 and the convention took place in Atlanta, dubbed 'Summercon X'.

In its modern incarnation, it is currently organized by redpantz(Chris Valasek) and shmeck, who emphasize the importance of face-to-face interaction as technology increasingly mediates relationships between members of the information security community. Summercon is open to everyone, including "hackers, phreakers, phrackers, feds, 2600 kids, cops, security professionals, U4EA, r00t kids club, press, groupies, chicks, conference whores, k0d3 kids, convicted felons, and concerned parents."

Year	Location	Notes
1987	St. Louis, MO	Held at June 19–21
1988	St. Louis, MO	Held at July 22–24
1989	St. Louis, MO	Held at June 23–25
1990	St. Louis, MO	Held at June 22–24
1991	St. Louis, MO	Officially titled CyberView, it was held at June 21–23
1992	St. Louis, MO	Held at June 26–28
1993	St. Louis, MO	
1995	Atlanta, GA	Held at the downtown Clarion Hotel by Erik Bloodaxe/LOD/Phrack, June 2–4
1996	Washington, D.C	Held at June 15–16
1997	Atlanta, GA	Held at May 31-June 2
1998	Atlanta, GA	Held at Comfort Inn, Downtown, June 5–7
1999	Atlanta, GA	Held at CNN Omni Hotel, June 4–6
2000	Atlanta, GA	Held at CNN Omni Hotel, June 2–4
2001	Amsterdam, NL	Held at the Hotel Krasnapolsky, June 1–3
2002	Washington, D.C	Held at the Renaissance Washington D.C. Hotel, May 31-June 2
2003	Pittsburgh, PA	Held at the University Club, June 6–8
2004	Pittsburgh, PA	Held at the University Club, June 11–13
2005	Austin, TX	Held at the Omni Austin Hotel Downtown, June 3–5
2006	Las Vegas, NV	Held at the Mandalay Bay Hotel and Casino, Aug 4–6
2007	Atlanta, GA	Held at the Wyndham Midtown Hotel, Aug 24–26
2008	Atlanta, GA	Held at the Wyndham Midtown Hotel, May 30-June 1
2009	Atlanta, GA	Held at the Hotel Midtown, June 5–6
2010	New York, NY	Held at the Delancey, June 18–20
2011	Brooklyn, NY	Held at Littlefield, June 10–12
2012	Brooklyn, NY	Held at Littlefield, June 8–10
2013	Hell's Kitchen, Manhattan, NY	Held at 404, June 7–8
2014	Manhattan, NY	Held at YOTEL, June 5–6
2015	Brooklyn, NY	Held at Littlefield, July 17–18
2016	Brooklyn, NY	Held at Littlefield, July 15–16
2017	Brooklyn, NY	Held at Littlefield, June 23–24
2018	Brooklyn, NY	Held at Littlefield, June 29–30
2019	Brooklyn, NY	Held at Littlefield, June 14–15
2020	Online	Held as a Virtual Conference on Zoom (software) and YouTube Live, June 13
2021	Brooklyn, NY & Online	Held as a hybrid conference, July 9–10. In-person event was held at Littlefield. Live video was streamed via YouTube Live.
2022	Brooklyn, NY & Online	Held as a hybrid conference, July 8–9. In-person event was held at Littlefield. Live video was streamed via YouTube Live.
2023	Brooklyn, NY & Online	Held as a hybrid conference, July 14–15. In-person event was held at Littlefield. Live video was streamed via YouTube Live.
2024	Brooklyn, NY & Online	Held as a hybrid conference, July 19–21. In-person event was held at Littlefield.
2025	Brooklyn, NY & Online	Held as a hybrid conference, July 11–12. In-person held at Littlefield; live stream on YouTube.

== See also ==
- Chaos Communication Congress (C3) — oldest and Europe's biggest hacker conferences held by Chaos Computer Club (CCC).
- HoHoCon — first modern hacker convention held by CULT OF THE DEAD COW.
- Black Hat Briefings the largest 'official' computer security event in the world.
- MyDEFCON gathering point spawned from the annual DEFCON security conference.
- The Hackers Conference An invitation-only gathering to discuss general topics within the computer industry.
