= Hacker =

Term for computer intruders and computing experts

A hacker is most commonly a person who seeks unauthorized access to a computer system or network. The word is also used for a skilled programmer or computer enthusiast. In computer security, it may describe an intruder or an authorized specialist who tests systems and reports vulnerabilities. Programmer and free software communities apply the term to people who explore programmable systems, modify software, or find ways around technical limits. Its meaning depends on context, and communities disagree over who may claim it.

The computing use of the term developed in student culture at the Massachusetts Institute of Technology during the late 1950s and early 1960s. At MIT, hacking ranged from playful technical work and pranks to unauthorized interference. During the 1970s and 1980s, personal computers and modem-connected networks took hacker culture beyond academic laboratories. Publicized intrusions and arrests, the 1983 film WarGames, and computer-crime laws shifted public usage toward unauthorized access. Security consulting, conferences, vulnerability disclosure, and bug bounty programs later gave some hackers recognized professional roles.

Hacker communities include programmer and free-software hackers, hardware hackers, white hat hackers, black hat hackers, and hacktivists. Their aims and legal status vary. Many value technical skill, experimentation, information sharing, and recognition from peers. Communities form around software projects, online forums, informal groups, hackerspaces, and conferences. Access may depend on skill, trust, and familiarity with group norms; even formally open communities can have cultural barriers. In security work, authorization and agreed limits separate professional testing from access without permission. Copyright law and software licenses set conditions for studying, modifying, and distributing programs; some laws also restrict the circumvention of technical protections.

News and popular culture portray hackers variously as criminals, cyberterrorists, socially isolated technical prodigies, activists, defenders, and security professionals. The favorable use of hack for an inventive solution has spread beyond computing in terms such as hackathon, civic hacking, biohacking, growth hacking, and life hack.

== Terminology and scope ==
Within computing, communities disagree over which uses of hacker are legitimate and who may claim the label.

=== Etymology and early uses ===
The verb hack, from Old English, originally meant to cut or sever with repeated blows, and hacker was used for a person who hacked in that physical sense centuries before electronic computers. The computing use developed from student slang at the Massachusetts Institute of Technology (MIT). The first edition of the Tech Model Railroad Club's dictionary, compiled in 1959, described a hack as an undertaking without a constructive purpose and a hacker as its practitioner. Before its close association with computers, the label involved playful tinkering and pranks involving machinery.

A negative usage also appeared early. In 1963, MIT's student newspaper, The Tech, called students who disrupted telephone services and made unauthorized long-distance calls "telephone hackers". Legal scholar Fred R. Shapiro documents both non-malicious tinkering and unauthorized interference in MIT usage before the word entered wider public use.

=== Competing definitions ===
Current dictionaries give two principal computing senses of hacker, an expert in programming and computer problem-solving and, more commonly, someone who attempts or gains unauthorized access to computer systems. Programmer and free software communities often use the word positively for people who enjoy exploring programmable systems, modifying software, and finding clever ways around technical limits. In computer security, the term includes lawful penetration testers and security experts as well as people who act without permission.

Vulnerabilities may be discovered and reported by researchers, developers, system administrators, users, academics, security companies, or government organizations. Not all of them use security researcher or hacker as a self-description. The senses of hacker overlap in skill and method but differ in authorization, purpose, and community identity. Outside computer security, hacker may describe an expert or enthusiast in another field or someone who works around practical limitations.

=== Related terminology ===
Programmer and free-software communities sometimes reserve hacker for a technical enthusiast and use cracker for someone who breaks into systems for malicious or illegal purposes. The distinction emerged during the 1980s in response to negative media portrayals. It remains disputed because lawful and unlawful hacking may use the same techniques. General dictionaries continue to list unauthorized computer access as one of the meanings of hacker.

An ethical hacker or white-hat hacker is a security professional who tests systems lawfully. A black hat acts illicitly or without sanction. A gray hat may act without permission but without the malicious intent usually associated with black hats.

A cybercriminal commits crimes through computers or the Internet. A script kiddie is an informal, disparaging term for a low-skill intruder who relies on programs written by others. A phreaker is someone who gains illegal access to or manipulates telephone systems. A hacktivist is someone who uses hacking to pursue political, social, religious, or ideological goals.

== Historical development ==
=== Early technical culture ===
Members of the Tech Model Railroad Club learned about switching circuits and logical control through the relay systems used to run their model railway, and some later experimented with computers made available to students at MIT. A computer-hacker community formed around MIT's TX-0 from about 1958 and expanded after a PDP-1 was installed in 1962. Unlike most computers of the period, which were operated by specialist staff, these machines could be used directly by members of the MIT community. The community had links to Project MAC and the MIT Artificial Intelligence Laboratory, and its members created experimental programs including a screen-based text editor and Spacewar!. In 1984, journalist Steven Levy used the phrase "hacker ethic" for values he associated with this community.

=== Expansion beyond academic computing ===
During the 1970s, less expensive microprocessors and personal-computer kits brought computing within reach of hobbyists outside universities, government laboratories, and large businesses. In Berkeley, Community Memory opened in 1973 as the first public computer-based bulletin board, giving people without previous computer access a place to exchange messages and information. The Homebrew Computer Club, founded in 1975, was a forum for hobbyists and experimenters, who shared ideas and demonstrated new hardware and software. The circulation of unauthorized copies of Altair BASIC led Microsoft founder Bill Gates to criticize hobbyists in a 1976 open letter. He argued that software copying deprived programmers of payment and discouraged the production of commercial software.

The personal-computer movement carried hacker culture into commercial software and the home video-game industry during the late 1970s and early 1980s. The GNU Project, begun in 1984, organized the development of a Unix-compatible operating system (OS) whose software could be run, copied, modified, and redistributed; GNU components were later combined with the Linux kernel to form a complete free OS.

=== Computer intrusion and the security meaning ===
The computer underground emerged in the 1980s from telephone phreaking and from users who explored computer systems outside institutional settings. As home computers and modems spread, bulletin board systems connected participants in different cities. They exchanged technical information, login credentials, software, and news. Underground hackers formed groups and published electronic magazines; the Legion of Doom and Phrack became well-known examples.

Participants explored systems and learned technical methods; they also competed with one another and sought peer recognition. Some separated those activities from payment-card fraud and destructive attacks, but there was no agreed boundary. During the 1980s, reports of arrests and computer intrusions made hacker increasingly synonymous with a digital trespasser. Programmers continued to use the term positively within technical culture.

=== Public adoption and legal conflict ===
The 1983 film WarGames brought computer intrusion to a mass audience and helped present hackers as a threat to national security. In the United States, Congress enacted the Computer Fraud and Abuse Act in 1986, creating federal offenses for specified forms of unauthorized access to protected computers. The Morris worm of 1988 disrupted a substantial part of the early Internet and led to the conviction of its creator Robert Tappan Morris in 1990, the first obtained under the act.

Operation Sundevil and related Secret Service investigations in 1990 targeted bulletin-board operators and people suspected of telecommunications and computer offenses. The raids and seizures raised questions about speech, privacy, and the legal treatment of electronic communications. The Electronic Frontier Foundation was founded in July that year after an investigation involving the publication of a telephone-system document, and it provided legal assistance in cases involving computer users and electronic communication.

=== Professionalization and institutionalization ===
Black Hat, a computer security conference that brings a variety of people interested in information security, including hackers.

During the 1990s, people from hacker and computer-underground communities began working in security consulting, software companies, and corporate research groups. Their knowledge of vulnerabilities became commercially useful. DEF CON, first held in 1993, and Black Hat, established in 1997, brought independent hackers into contact with security firms, technology vendors, government personnel, and law-enforcement officers. The Bugtraq mailing list, created in 1993, gave vulnerability finders a public forum for technical disclosures. It also allowed them to build professional reputations and pressured vendors to correct reported flaws. In 1998, members of L0pht testified before the United States Senate as computer-security experts rather than criminal defendants.

Coordinated-disclosure policies and bug bounty programs later gave researchers formal ways to report vulnerabilities and work with affected organizations. Security tests that imitate attacks are generally carried out by penetration testers or white-hat hackers. In 2016, the United States Department of Defense ran Hack the Pentagon, the first bug-bounty program in the federal government. Eligible participants tested selected public websites under defined rules. The word retained conflicting meanings after professionalization: it described trusted security specialists and people regarded as computer-security threats.

== Types and activities ==
There are various hacker communities who can overlap with each other.

=== Programmer and free-software hackers ===
In the programmer tradition, hacking means understanding and modifying software. It also includes technically inventive ways to make a computer behave as intended or do something unexpected. Programmer hacking began in academic laboratories and spread to personal computing and commercial software. Open-source hacker communities disagree over proprietary software and the role of commercial businesses.

Free software hackers are part of the programmer tradition. Their projects use licenses that permit users to study, modify, and redistribute programs. Internet-based projects often draw contributors from many locations. They release early versions for testing and incorporate corrections from users and programmers. Open licenses permit anyone to alter the code. Established projects usually have maintainers who decide which changes enter the official version. Free-software hackers emphasize continuing software freedom. Open-source hackers place more weight on development methods and freedom of choice in using software.

=== Hardware hackers ===
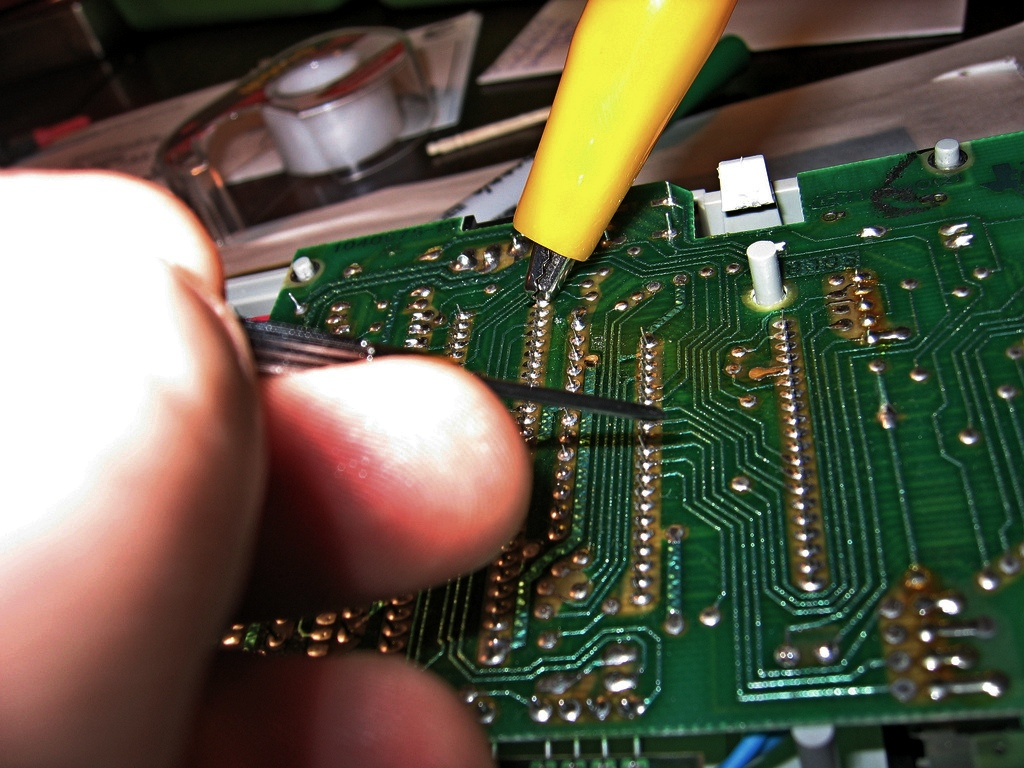
A DIY musician probes the circuit board of a synthesizer for "bends" using a jeweler's screwdriver and alligator clips.

Hackerspaces host programming, device building, and other experimentation with digital technology. In this setting, hacking usually means constructive technical work.

Open-source hardware provides design files that others can study, modify, manufacture, and redistribute. A physical design still requires components, materials, and manufacturing before it becomes a working object. Hardware may also contain weaknesses exploitable through physical or remote access.

=== Phreakers and the computer underground ===
Phreakers are mostly a historical classification due to the phase out of analog telephony. They explore and manipulate telephone networks and the technologies used to control calls. During the 1970s, phreaking included technical experimentation, pranks, avoidance of telephone charges, and campaigns that treated the Bell System as a target of political protest. Phreaking publications and practices later influenced parts of the computer underground.

The computer underground contained exploratory intruders as well as people engaged in fraud, theft, or deliberate damage. Members disagreed about where hacking ended and criminal abuse began.

=== White hat hackers ===
A white hat hacker or ethical hacker breaks security for non-malicious reasons, either to test their own security system, perform penetration tests or vulnerability assessments for a client, or while working for a security company that makes security software. The term is generally synonymous with ethical hacker, and certifications, courseware, classes, and online training covering the diverse arena of ethical hacking have been developed.

In computer security, a hacker is a person with the expertise to find or exploit weaknesses in computer systems. The label alone does not show whether the activity is authorized or malicious. Authorized penetration testers and other specialists imitate attacks within an agreed scope, demonstrate vulnerabilities, and report their findings to the organization responsible for the system.

=== Hacktivists or gray hat hackers ===
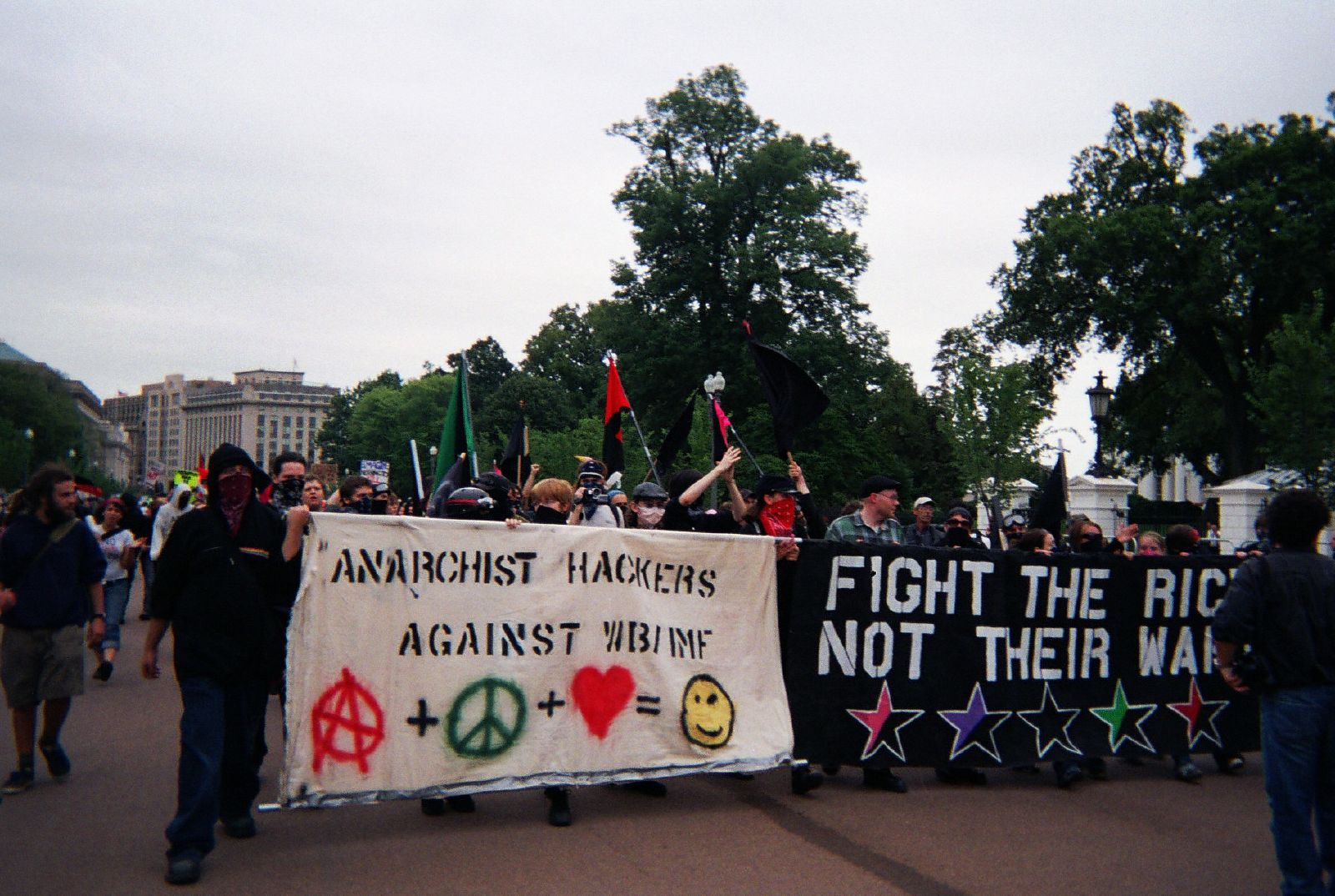
Anarchist hacktivist protest in the US

Hacktivists use computer skills and digital action to advance political or social causes. Their activities include distributing information, developing tools for political campaigns, defacing websites, disclosing information without authorization, and interrupting online services. Ordinary online advocacy is not usually classed as hacktivism unless it involves direct technical intervention or a contentious action against a chosen target.

Gray hats may act without permission but lack the malicious intent normally associated with black hats.

Hacktivism has been described as the digital counterpart of civil disobedience, but unauthorized disruption or access may still be treated as crime regardless of political purpose. Cyberterrorism generally refers to operations intended to cause grave harm, widespread fear, loss of life, or severe damage to essential systems. News reports and government statements have sometimes grouped hacktivism with cyberterrorism or treated politically motivated hackers primarily as security threats.

=== Black hat hackers and organized crime groups ===
A black hat hacker is a hacker who "violates computer security for little reason beyond maliciousness or for personal gain". The term was coined by Richard Stallman, to contrast the maliciousness of a criminal hacker versus the spirit of playfulness and exploration in hacker culture, or the ethos of the white hat hacker who performs hacking duties to identify places to repair or as a means of legitimate employment. Black hat hackers form the stereotypical, illegal hacking groups often portrayed in popular culture, and are "the epitome of all that the public fears in a computer criminal".

Groups of hackers that carry out organized criminal activities for profit. Modern-day computer hackers have been compared to the privateers of by-gone days. These criminals hold computer systems hostage, demanding large payments from victims to restore access to their own computer systems and data. Cyber theft and ransomware attacks are now the fastest-growing crimes in the United States. Bitcoin and other cryptocurrencies facilitate the extortion of huge ransoms from large companies, hospitals and city governments with little or no chance of being caught.

=== Script kiddies ===
A script kiddie (also known as a skid or skiddie) is a derogatory term for an unskilled hacker who breaks into computer systems by using automated tools written by others (usually by other black hat hackers), hence the term script (i.e. a computer script that automates the hacking) kiddie (i.e. kid, child an individual lacking knowledge and experience, immature), usually with little understanding of the underlying concept.

== Culture and social organization ==
=== Ethics and values ===
Accounts of early MIT hacker culture emphasize computer access, information sharing, decentralization, and status based on technical work rather than formal rank. Later hacker traditions also value technical workmanship and clever ways of circumventing constraints. Anthropologist and academic Gabriella Coleman notes that hackers may judge work by its quality or elegance and may also value humor and playfulness.

Hacker communities differ over software freedom, privacy, commercial work, and political action. Coleman associates civil-liberties and anti-authoritarian commitments with many Western hackers, but limits libertarianism to particular regions and projects. In a 2003 survey of 684 free and open-source developers, enjoyment and creativity were the strongest reported motives. Respondents also cited user need, intellectual stimulation, and skill development; about two-fifths received payment for their work. A 2021 survey found that learning and intellectual stimulation remained important. Other motives, including social connection, reputation, career advancement, enjoyment, and helping others, varied with experience.

=== Learning, collaboration and reputation ===
Hackers often learn by working directly with systems and exchanging knowledge with peers. Mailing lists, chat channels, code repositories, forums, electronic publications, and shared workshops are used for questions, code review, publication, and testing. Large free-software projects may have maintainers, membership procedures, contributor review, and voting. Elite security-hacker groups have sometimes limited sensitive information to trusted members who demonstrated technical ability. Hacker activity is often social and organized around projects, conferences, and groups.

Security hackers gain standing through visible technical contributions and recognition from peers. A pseudonymous handle can hide a person's legal identity while preserving credit and group affiliation for tools, exploits, or publications. As professional security work expanded, some hackers began using their legal names so that vulnerability disclosures and technical tools could support résumés, employment, and public credibility. Public credit also led to disputes over private knowledge, reused code, and work claimed by another person.

=== Organizations, spaces and events ===
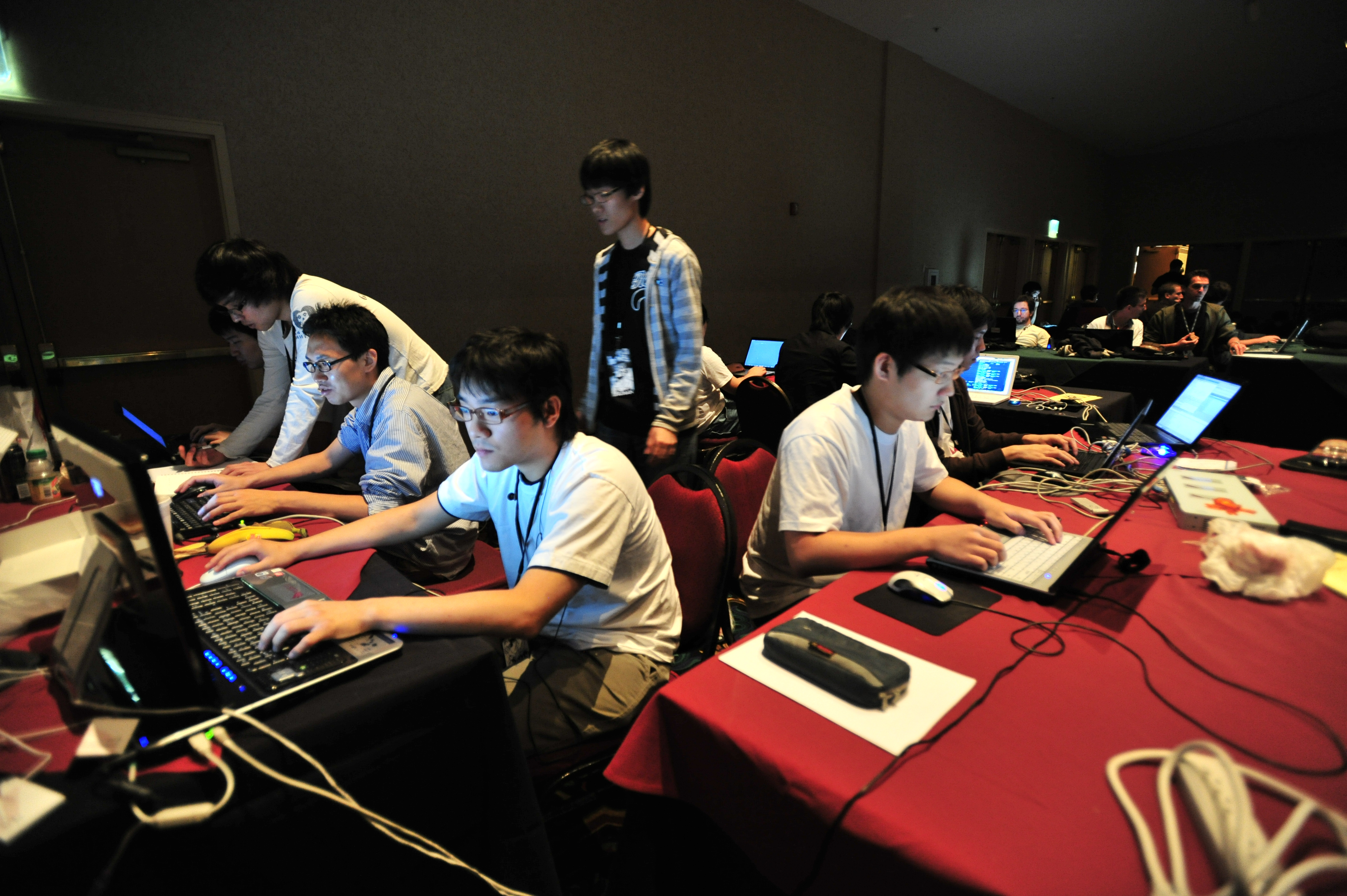
A team competing in a capture-the-flag security contest at DEF CON 17 in 2009

Hacker communities organize as online projects, informal crews, publications, advocacy groups, shared workspaces, and conferences. A hackerspace is a community-run physical place where people work on projects and learn from one another. Local rules and values govern the use of shared space and technology. Groups also use chat services, mailing lists, and repositories between meetings. Examples of events are SummerCon (Summer), DEF CON, HoHoCon (Christmas), ShmooCon (February), Black Hat Conference, Chaos Communication Congress, and H.O.P.E.

Security-hacker meetups and conferences bring together people who otherwise interact at a distance. Newcomers learn techniques and meet participants from the wider scene. Conference programs include lectures and technical demonstrations, alongside project work, informal discussion, games, and social events. Some security events are run by volunteer communities; others are tied to companies, government agencies, or professional security work. Free-software projects hold their own meetings for development, governance, and community business. Meeting in person strengthens relationships otherwise maintained online.

=== Participation and internal boundaries ===
Formal openness does not eliminate informal cultural barriers in free-culture and open-source communities. In security-hacker groups, membership and access to private knowledge may depend on skill, trust, contribution history, and familiarity with group norms. In free-culture settings, meritocratic ideals can coexist with narrow ideas of the "real hacker", adversarial discussion, and informal personal networks.

Gender imbalance is well documented in free and open-source software. A review of 51 publications estimated that women accounted for about 9.8% of contributors and identified low peer parity and non-inclusive communication among the main social barriers. Reports from conferences and online free-culture communities also document sexist remarks, harassment, and exclusion. Women in the security-hacker scene have described support from peers, along with encounters in which others ignored or doubted their technical interest. Responses in free-culture communities have included women-focused initiatives and clearer conduct or governance measures. Feminist hackerspaces provide settings for technical learning, skill sharing, and community work. Some address barriers involving race, sexuality, gender identity, and class as well as the underrepresentation of women.

== Ethics and legality ==
=== Authorization and consent ===
Before a professional security test, rules of engagement usually specify the authorized activities and their limits. A public vulnerability-disclosure policy authorizes independent research only on the systems and methods covered by its terms. The United States Department of Justice policy permits only enough testing to confirm a vulnerability. It forbids removing data or maintaining access after testing. Researchers may not gain higher privileges, move into connected systems, install malware, or disrupt services. Anyone uncertain about whether a target or method is covered is expected to seek clarification before continuing.

Permission from one organization does not extend to systems, information, or services controlled by third parties. Compliance with a disclosure policy also does not excuse unrelated violations of law. In the United States, Department of Justice charging policy directs federal prosecutors to decline prosecution under the Computer Fraud and Abuse Act when the evidence shows an intent to conduct security research in good faith. The policy defines this as testing, investigating, or correcting a security flaw in a way designed to avoid harm and using the findings mainly to improve security or safety. The policy is internal guidance for federal prosecutors; it creates no legal right enforceable by a researcher.

=== Vulnerability disclosure ===
With vulnerability disclosure, hackers can raise awareness of flaws in technical systems. This is often coordinated with vendors, CERTs, or other affected parties before publication. After discovery and reporting, the recipient confirms and prioritizes the flaw. Repair and public disclosure follow, together with release of a fix or another protective measure. A report should identify the affected product or configuration and explain the possible impact. It should also give steps for reproducing the flaw and provide evidence or a working demonstration. The recipient then decides how urgently the confirmed vulnerability should be addressed.

Remediation removes a vulnerability. Mitigation reduces its effect without removing the underlying flaw. A reliable patch may take time to develop and test, especially when vulnerable code is reused across products or supplied by another vendor. The United States Department of Labor's disclosure policy directs researchers to stop testing after confirming a flaw or encountering sensitive data. It also asks them to allow time for remediation before publishing technical details. Under the CERT/CC model, later stages include public notice, publication of the vulnerability and remediation plan, and deployment of a fix or mitigation.

=== Information freedom and intellectual property ===
Copyright generally protects the expression of a computer program. It does not protect the program's ideas, procedures, methods of operation, or mathematical concepts. In the European Union, copyright holders control reproduction, alteration, and public distribution of computer programs, subject to stated exceptions. Free-software licenses give users the freedom to run, study, modify, copy, and redistribute programs. Copyleft licenses require redistributed versions to preserve those freedoms. Free software may also use licenses without that requirement.

European Union law permits users to observe and test software in some circumstances. A lawful user may also translate necessary portions of compiled code into another form when this is essential to make an independently created program work with other software. The information must otherwise be unavailable. Information obtained under this exception cannot be used for unrelated purposes or shared except as needed for compatibility. It also cannot be used to produce a substantially similar infringing program. The directive requires remedies against commercial dealings in tools intended solely to bypass technical protections on software.

== Public image and representation ==
=== In the news media and public discourse ===
News coverage frequently uses hacker for an unauthorized intruder and associates the term with computer crime, security threats, and disruption. In five United States newspapers studied for the year before and after the September 11 attacks, reports increasingly framed hackers as possible cyberterrorists. Earlier coverage more often treated them as ordinary computer criminals. Motives received little attention unless an article profiled a hacker. Reports also blurred hacktivism and cyberterrorism, although the conduct did not involve the same aims or level of harm.

National politics also affect portrayals of hackers. A comparison of China Daily and The New York Times from 2001 to 2020 found that both newspapers gave states a prominent role in hacker coverage. Each framed accusations and foreign governments from its own national and political perspective. Positive references became more common over time, particularly in coverage of ethical hackers and defensive security work. However, associations with hostile activity remained.

Visual reports frequently show hackers in dark rooms, with obscured faces, hooded clothing, masks, or screens filled with code. Author James Shires describes this imagery as "cyber-noir", computer security appears as a hidden, morally uncertain world in which anonymous threats and specialists may use similar methods for different ends.

=== In popular culture ===
Hacker characters in film, television, and computer games have changed over time. In the 1980s, WarGames (1983) and early hacking games featured gifted but socially isolated young people who entered powerful systems from home computers and became caught up in events beyond ordinary life. In the 1990s, Hackers (1995) presented the hacker as a stylish subcultural rebel. The Matrix (1999) turned that figure into a hero resisting an oppressive digital system.

Later films such as Swordfish (2001) and Blackhat (2015) placed hackers in stories about terrorism, surveillance, cybercrime, and international conflict. Their hackers could be dangerous offenders, necessary allies, or both. The television series Mr. Robot (2015–19) returned to the socially alienated hacker but gave the character greater psychological depth. It connected hacking with mental illness, surveillance, corporate power, political anger, and the personal consequences of technical action. The series used recognizable tools and plausible attack methods instead of presenting every intrusion as a visual spectacle.

Many screen portrayals differ sharply from actual hacking practices. In a sample of 50 film and television scenes released between 2010 and 2022, attacks were completed quickly and succeeded at unusually high rates. The technical process was usually hidden behind a simplified "black box". Computer games let players perform simplified intrusions and choose targets or tools. Players may take the role of a criminal, mercenary, activist, or defender.

== Extensions of the term ==
The favorable computing sense of hack, meaning an inventive way to solve a problem, has spread beyond programming and computer security. A hackathon is a short event in which programmers, often joined by people from other specialties, work intensively to create code or a prototype. Hackathons are also used to build scientific collaborations and communities or to develop prototypes for urgent problems.

Civic hacking applies technical and design skills to public problems, often through government data or redesigned public services. Participants include programmers, designers, data specialists, organizers, entrepreneurs, and government employees. The label does not imply unauthorized access. In do-it-yourself biology, biohackers conduct biological experiments outside conventional academic or industrial laboratories. The term biohacking is also used for health and wellness practices, technological augmentation, and self-directed experiments involving the body or mind.

In business, growth hacking is iterative, data-driven experimentation intended to help an organization scale and adapt. The term is used beyond startups and marketing. A life hack is a simple tip or technique for completing an ordinary task more easily or efficiently.

== See also ==
- "Hacker Manifesto" – a 1986 essay associated with the computer underground
- List of hackers – notable people described as hackers
- List of security hacking incidents – notable events involving computer-security hacking
