= HoHoCon =

HoHoCon (or XmasCon) was a conference series which took place shortly before or after Christmas in Houston, Texas, sponsored by Drunkfux and the hacker ezine Cult of the Dead Cow. The fourth and fifth HoHoCons were also sponsored by Phrack magazine and took place in Austin, Texas. Phreaking software BlueBEEP was released at HoHoCon '93.

HoHoCon is generally credited as being the first "modern" hacker con, although Summercon was around before it. It inspired later conventions such as DEF CON and HOPE.

All together, there were five conferences.

== Conferences ==
- HoHoCon '90 (XmasCon) (Houston, Texas, December 28 - 30 1990)
- HoHoCon '91 (Houston, Texas, December 27 - 29 1991)
- HoHoCon '92 (Houston, Texas, December 18 - 20 1992)
- HoHoCon '93 (Austin, Texas, December 17 - 19 1993)
- HoHoCon '94 (Austin, Texas, December 30, 1994 - January 1, 1995)
