= Growth hacking =

Subfield of marketing

Growth hacking is a subfield of marketing focused on the rapid growth of a company. It is referred to as both a process and a set of cross-disciplinary (digital) skills. The goal is to regularly conduct experiments, which can include A/B testing, that will lead to improving the customer journey, and replicate and scale the ideas that work and modify or abandon the ones that do not, before investing a lot of resources. It started in relation to early-stage startups that need rapid growth within a short time on tight budgets, and also reached bigger corporate companies.

A growth hacking team is made up of marketers, developers, engineers and product managers that specifically focus on building and engaging the user base of a business. Growth hacking is not just a process for marketers. It can be applied to product development and to the continuous improvement of products as well as to growing an existing customer base. As such, it is equally useful to everyone from product developers, to engineers, to designers, to salespeople, to managers.

== Competencies ==
Those who specialise in growth hacking use various types of marketing and product iterations to rapidly test persuasive copy, email marketing, search engine optimization, and viral strategies, among other tools and techniques, intending to increase conversion rates and achieve rapid growth of the user base. Some consider growth hacking a part of the online marketing ecosystem, as in many cases, growth hackers are using techniques such as search engine optimization, website analytics, content marketing, and A/B testing. On the other hand, not all marketers have the data or technical skills of a growth hacker; therefore, it is appropriate to use a distinct name for this specialty.

== History ==
Sean Ellis coined the term "growth hacker" in 2010. In the blog post, he defined a growth hacker as "a person whose true north is growth. Everything they do is scrutinized by its potential impact on scalable growth." Andrew Chen introduced the term to a wider audience in a blog post titled, "Growth Hacker is the new VP Marketing" in which he defined the term and used the short term vacation rental platform Airbnb's integration of Craigslist as an example. He wrote that growth hackers "are a hybrid of marketer and coder, one who looks at the traditional question of 'How do I get customers for my product?' and answers with A/B tests, landing pages, viral factor, email deliverability, and Open Graph." In the book "Growth Hacking", Chad Riddersen and Raymond Fong define a Growth Hacker as "a highly resourceful and creative marketer singularly focused on high leverage growth"

The second annual (2013) "Growth Hackers Conference" was held in San Francisco set up by Gagan Biyani. It featured growth hackers from LinkedIn, Twitter, and YouTube among others.

== Methods ==
Growth hackers approach marketing with a focus on innovation, scalability, and user connectivity. Growth hacking does not, however, separate product design and product effectiveness from marketing. Growth hackers build the product's potential growth, including user acquisition, on-boarding, monetization, retention, and virality, into the product itself. Growth hacking is all about intention and efficiency. So there is always a chance you'll hit on something huge and have a viral campaign. Fast Company used Twitter's "Suggested Users List" as example: "This was Twitter's real secret: It built marketing into the product rather than building infrastructure to do a lot of marketing." However growth hacking isn't always free. TechCrunch shared several nearly free growth hacks explaining that growth hacking is effective marketing and not mythical marketing pixie dust.

The heart of growth hacking is the relentless focus on growth as the only metric that truly matters. Mark Zuckerberg had this mindset while growing Facebook. While the exact methods vary from company to company and from one industry to the next, the common denominator is always growth. Companies that have successfully "growth hacked" usually have a viral loop naturally built into their onboarding process. New customers typically hear about the product or service through their network and by using the product or service, share it with their connections in turn. This loop of awareness, use, and sharing can result in exponential growth for the company.

Twitter, Facebook, Dropbox, Pinterest, YouTube, Groupon, Udemy, Instagram and Google are all companies that used and still use growth hacking techniques to build brands and improve profits.

=== Examples of growth hacks ===
Below are the examples of growth hacks and are the most well-known acts of growth hacking. Often people see growth hacking as merely repeating these growth hacks, but one should know that the 'hacks' are only the result of a repeatable growth hacking process, which all growth hackers use a way of working. Below are some of the most famous growth hacking examples:

- An early example of "growth hacking" was Hotmail's inclusion of "PS I Love You" with a link for others to get the free online mail service. Another example was the offer of more storage by Dropbox to users who referred their friends.
- Online lodging company Airbnb is an example of growth hacking; they realized they could essentially hack the Craiglist.org scale and tap both into their user base as well as their website by adding automated listing generators from Airbnb with the feature called "Post to Craigslist".
