= Sean Ellis (entrepreneur) =

Entrepreneur, angel investor and startup advisor

- Education: University of California, Davis
- Occupation: Entrepreneur
- Known for: Qualaroo, LogMeIn, Dropbox
- Website: www.startup-marketing.com

Sean Ellis is an entrepreneur, angel investor, and startup advisor. He is the founder of GrowthHackers and was previously the founder and CEO of Qualaroo, an automated user research tool.

He attended the University of California, Davis and graduated in 1994.

== Career ==
Ellis was the head of marketing at LogMeIn and Uproar from launch to IPO. He was the first marketer at Dropbox, Lookout and Xobni. He joined Dropbox because he believed in the product's potential, had strong chemistry with the founder, and trusted the endorsement from the CEO of Xobni, who was best friends with Dropbox CEO Drew Houston and spoke highly of him.

He is an advisor to KISSmetrics and Eventbrite, a mentor at 500 Startups, and a Board Member for Mavenlink and SignNow (acquired by Barracuda Networks). He also is an investor in Bitium.

Ellis has contributed to Entrepreneur and The Wall Street Journal.
