= Hacktivismo Enhanced-Source Software License Agreement =

- Author: Oxblood Ruffin
- Debian FSG compatible: No
- FSF approved: No
- OSI approved: No
- GPL compatible: No
- Website: www.hacktivismo.com/about/hessla.php

The Hacktivismo Enhanced-Source Software License Agreement (HESSLA) is a software license proposed by Hacktivismo that attempts to put ethical restrictions on use and modification of software released under it.

The license was written by Oxblood Ruffin (of Hacktivismo and CULT OF THE DEAD COW) and Eric Grimm, an attorney with the EFF.

The HESSLA allows for enhancements to be made and for derivative works to be created, but it prohibits the use or modification of the software to violate human rights or to introduce features that spy on the user. It is intended to be a legally enforceable document. However, due to these restrictions, it is not technically a free software license or an open source license, though it was inspired by free software and open source licenses.

== Criticism ==
HESSLA has been criticized by the Free Software Foundation for introducing restrictions that they claim are ineffective for preventing abuse, but introduce legal incompatibility with other licenses. It also is listed as a good example of a human rights license in the Creative Commons wiki.

== Derivatives ==
The web browser xB Browser was temporarily based on the Torrify Ethical Software License Agreement (TESLA) which was built upon HESSLA.

== See also ==
- 996 working hour system § 996.ICU GitHub campaign
- Douglas Crockford § "Good, not Evil"
