= Cult of the Dead Cow =

Hacker organization

- cDc Paramedia Logo
- Formation: 1984
- Purpose: Hacking/DIY media
- Location: International
- Origin: Lubbock, Texas
- Founders: Grandmaster Ratte'; Franken Gibe; Sid Vicious (pseudonym)
- Products: The original e-zine Back Orifice; BO2k; NBName; SMBRelay; Torpark
- Key people: Mudge; DilDog; Sir Dystic; The Deth Vegetable; FreqOut; Oxblood Ruffin; Omega; White Knight; Reid Fleming; Krass Katt; Lord Digital; Obscure Images; Tweety Fish; Lady Carolin; ChukE; JavaMan; Dark Sorcerer; Hella Kitty; Sunspot; Count Zero; G.A. Ellsworth; Greenpeace; Myles Long; Mixter; Assrabbit Psychedelic Warlord (Beto O'Rourke); Medus4; Jun34u; Lodri; BiaSciLab
- Affiliations: Hacktivismo; Ninja Strike Force; L0pht; Mindvox; Legion of Doom; Masters of Deception; YIPL/TAP; Sacrament of Transition; Hong Kong Blondes; RDT; ACiD Productions; Soulz at Zero; Neon Knights r00t
- Website: cultdeadcow.com
- Formerly called: Pan-Galactic Entropy

Cult of the Dead Cow, also known as cDc or cDc Communications, is a computer hacker and DIY media organization founded in 1984 in Lubbock, Texas. The group maintains a weblog on its site, also titled "[Cult of the Dead Cow]". New media are released first through the blog, which also features thoughts and opinions of the group's members.

== Timeline ==
 _   _
((___))
[ x x ]
 \   /
 (' ')
  (U)

cDc's ASCII art
cowskull logo

The group was formed in June 1984 at the Farm Pac slaughterhouse by Grandmaster Ratte' (aka Swamp Ratte'), Franken Gibe, Sid Vicious, and three BBS SysOps. (Note: The slaughterhouse, a hangout of many Lubbock youth, was burned down in 1996. The burned out building was used as a haunted house for several Halloweens after that. In 2001, the grounds surrounding it were converted into the "West Texas Canyon Amphitheater" and re-opened as the Lone Star Amphitheater in 2006))

In the 1980s the Cult of the Dead Cow organized and maintained a loose collective of affiliated BBSs across the US and Canada. It was during this time that the cDc is credited with coining the term "31337" as an alternative spelling of "Eleet" or "Elite", an expression denoting skill or greatness in a person, place, or thing.

In December 1990, cDc member Jesse Dryden (aka Drunkfux), the son of Jefferson Airplane drummer Spencer Dryden and grand nephew of Charlie Chaplin, created HoHoCon. It was the first modern hacker conference, which invites the participation of both journalists and law enforcement. It is usually held in Houston, Texas. In all, dFx hosted five annual HoHoCons.

In 1991, cDc was named "Sassiest Underground Computer Group" by Sassy magazine. Also in 1991, the group began distributing music in the form of cassette tape albums sold through its post office box. Many of these albums are now available online in their entirety.

October 1994 saw the creation of the cDc's Usenet newsgroup, alt.fan.cult-dead-cow. It was thus the first hacking group to have its own Usenet newsgroup. In November of that year, the group claimed responsibility for giving Ronald Reagan Alzheimer's disease, claiming to have done so in 1986 with a blowgun.

The cDc declared war on the Church of Scientology in 1995 during the alt.religion.scientology controversy, stating

We believe that El Ron Hubbard [sic] is actually none other than Heinrich Himmler of the SS, who fled to Argentina and is now responsible for the stealing of babies from hospitals and raising them as 'super-soldiers' for the purpose of overthrowing the U.S. Fed. Govt. in a bloody revolution. We fear plans for a 'Fourth Reich' to be established on our home soil under the vise-like grip of oppression known as Scientology!

In 1997, the cDc began distributing original MP3-format music on its website.

In August 1998, they presented their popular Back Orifice tool at DEF CON 6.

In February 2000, the cDc was the subject of an 11-minute documentary short titled "Disinformation". Also in February 2000, cDc member Mudge briefed President Bill Clinton on Internet security.

In 2019, journalist Joseph Menn published a book about the history of the group, Cult of the Dead Cow: How the Original Hacking Supergroup Might Just Save the World.

== cDc communications ==
cDc communications is the parent organisation of Cult of the Dead Cow, one of three groups that fall under cDc communications. The other two are the Ninja Strike Force and Hacktivismo.

=== Ninja Strike Force ===
In 1996, the cDc announced the birth of its Ninja Strike Force, a group of "ninja" dedicated to achieving the goals of the cDc, an intervention task force both online and offline. The cDc opened the NSF Dojo in 2004. An "NSF Dojo" Member also operates a streaming radio station, which features recordings of hacker con presentations and other educational programming in addition to a wide range of musical styles and artists.

Membership in the NSF is granted by the cDc to those individuals who stand out in their support of the cDc and its ideals. Members are recognized for their abilities, capabilities, and being the best of the best in their skills.

In 2006 the Ninja Strike Force launched its own microsite.

=== Hacktivismo ===
In late 1999, the cDc created Hacktivismo, an independent group under the cDc communications umbrella dedicated to the creation of anti-censorship technology in furtherance of human rights on the Internet. The group's beliefs are described fully in The Hacktivismo Declaration, which seeks to apply the Universal Declaration of Human Rights and the International Covenant on Civil and Political Rights to the Internet. Among Hacktivismo's beliefs include access to information as a basic human right. The organization partially shares Critical Art Ensemble's (CAE) belief in the value of secrecy, but challenges both with CAE and many hacktivists on the subject of civil disobedience. The cDc model is, instead, one of disruptive compliance. Disruptive, in this case, refers to disruptive technology; compliance refers back to the Internet and its original intent of constructive free-flow and openness. Hacktivismo has also authored its own software license agreement, the Hacktivismo Enhanced-Source Software License Agreement, which is source available (but not open source). Their work focuses on the development of software that empowers conduct forbidden by repression, rather than enabling (private or public) attacks on repressors. In general cDc hopes that open code can become the lingua franca of a hacktivism that seeks to wage peace, not war. While the term isn't used, the software described in cDc's "Waging of Peace on the Internet" would create a set of connections between dissidents that sound in technoliberationist terms, rhizomatic.

=== Crossover associations with other groups ===
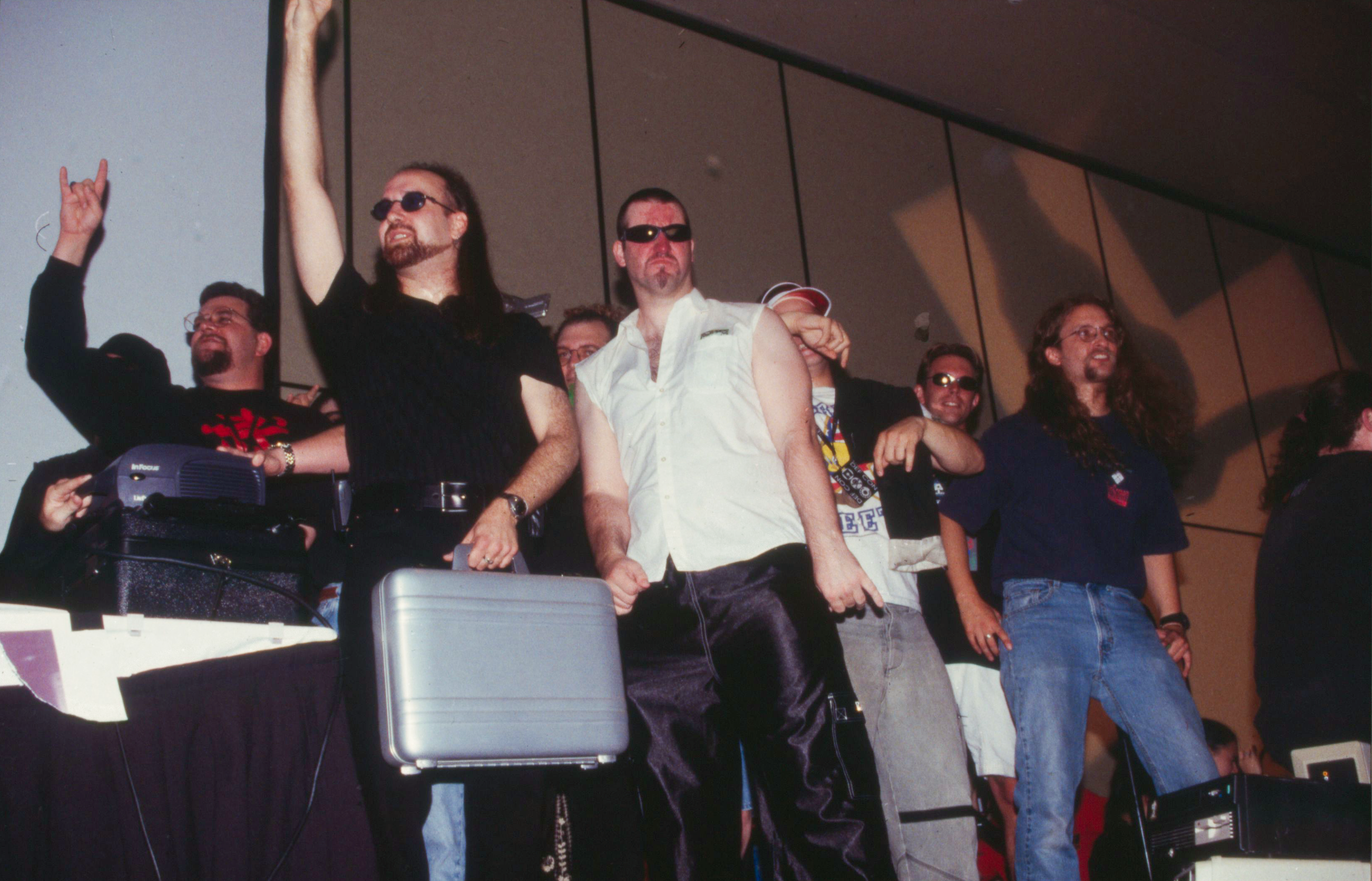
cDc members at Defcon in 1999

In addition to the obvious associations between Cult of the Dead Cow, Hacktivismo, and the Ninja Strike Force, the cDc also has crossover associations with several other organizations. These include the L0pht; founding members White Knight and Count Zero and final members Dildog and Mudge are all members of cDc. Additionally, The Nightstalker was a member of Youth International Party Line/Technology Assistance Program. Lord Digital, one of the founders of Mindvox, is a former member of LOD/H and a current member of the Sacrament of Transition. Red Knight was a member of the Masters of Deception. Also, RaD Man, a member of the Ninja Strike Force, is one of the founders of ACiD Productions. Another NSF member, Mark Hinge, is a founding member of the British hacker group The Syndicate Of London. Flack, another Ninja Strike Force member, was a co-founder of the horror "lit group" Soulz at Zero. Mudge later went on to program manage the CINDER program at DARPA, which aimed to detect 'insider threats' like the WikiLeaks sources.

== Electronic publication ==
During the 1980s, the cDc was well known throughout the BBS scene for their underground ezine, also called Cult of the Dead Cow. The group claims to have invented the ezine.

The Cult of the Dead Cow has been credited with coining the term "elite" as used in the hacker scene/computer underground in cDc textfiles of the 1980s.

The ezine has led to some criticism of the group over the years; in a 1994 episode of Geraldo entitled "Computer Vice", Geraldo Rivera referred to the group as "a bunch of sickos" for having published an article called "Sex with Satan", originally published in 1988.

== Hacktivism ==
In 1996, cDc member Omega coined the term "hacktivism" in an email to other group members. The group has been active in hacktivist causes since that time.

=== Hong Kong Blondes Hoax ===
In 1997, the cDc claimed to have worked with a group of Chinese dissidents called "The Hong Kong Blondes", and through a series of public statements and media coverage created a narrative about an activist group operating within the People's Republic of China that could disrupt computer networks within that country in order to allow citizens to access censored content online. In time, it emerged that the group was, in fact, fictitious, though the story about its capabilities and aims briefly took on a life of its own.

The cDc first spoke about the Hong Kong Blondes publicly in a presentation at the 1997 Beyond HOPE Conference held at The Puck Building in New York City. Members claimed to have advised the group on strong encryption techniques. In remarks and an interview with Wired, the cDc claimed that the Hong Kong Blondes had 20 members, including "three highly placed technicians" as well as some government bureaucrats in Beijing, and was led by a dissident physicist living in Toronto. They further claimed, without offering evidence, that the Blondes had temporarily disabled a Chinese communications satellite as a way of "introducing itself" to authorities. The claims were all sourced to the cDc's Foreign Minister, Oxblood Ruffin.

In 1998, Ruffin published a transcript of a purported interview with Blondie Wong claiming that the Blondes were forming an affiliate group of hackers and activists based in North America and Europe, aiming to support the cause of human rights in China. The contents of the interview were covered by Wired and by Naomi Klein, then a journalist for The Toronto Star. Later in 1998, the cDc issued a statement in which it claimed to have formally severed ties with the Hong Kong Blondes.

Despite having offered no verifiable evidence of any hacking activity within China, or even the existence of any members of the Hong Kong Blondes, the claims garnered media attention from outlets including Wired, The Los Angeles Times, U.S. News & World Report, and The Toronto Star. The coverage caught the attention of National Security Advisor Richard A. Clarke. In a private White House meeting with Clarke and President Bill Clinton in 2000, Clarke asked about the group. Mudge admitted, "We made them up." In social media post in 2015, Oxblood conceded that the Hong Kong Blondes amounted to publicity campaign the point of which was to create cover for the extraction of seven Chinese pro-democracy activists, though he offered no evidence that such an operation occurred.

=== Cyberwar ===
On January 7, 1999, the cDc joined with an international coalition of hackers to denounce a call to cyberwar against the governments of China and Iraq.

=== Milošević trial ===
When questioning Patrick Ball during his International War Crimes Tribunal in 2002, Slobodan Milošević asked Ball about his relationship with the cDc. Ball had given a talk and been a member of a cDc-sponsored panel on hacktivism at DEF CON 9 in 2001.

=== Goolag campaign ===
In early 2006, the cDc launched the "Goolag" (a play on gulag, Soviet forced labour camps) campaign in response to Google's decision to comply with China's Internet censorship policy and censor search results in the mainland-Chinese version of its search engine. The campaign consists primarily of the use of a parody of Google's logo which reads "Goolag: Exporting censorship, one search at a time". The group encouraged readers to make t-shirts and other merchandise and donate any proceeds from their sale to Human Rights in China.

Students for a Free Tibet held an anti-Google rally in Dharamsala, India on February 14, 2006, employing the logo in a variety of ways. The cDc then issued a press release about the campaign, wherein it described Microsoft, Yahoo!, Google, and Cisco as the "Gang of Four" due to their respective policies of compliance with the Beijing government's Internet policies. The United States Congress was also called out on this issue in the release. This press release, originally entitled "Congress jerks off, gang of four reach for raincoats", was picked up by many news sources, as an abbreviated version of it was distributed by PR Web (with the altered title of "Cult of the Dead Cow (cDc) Launches Campaign Against Internet Censorship in China").

== Tools ==
The cDc has released several tools, for both hackers/system administrators and for the general public. Many of these are related to computer security and are sometimes dubbed "hacker tools".

=== The Automated Prayer Project ===
The Automated Prayer Project, written by Javaman, is "a VT420 connected to a Sun Ultra5 via a serial cable which displays the output of a continuously running program. The signaling rate is limited to 9600 baud. The program itself cycles through the Rosary, displaying a new individual prayer once every thirty seconds. Each individual prayer is then sent out via UDP to a random machine on the Internet on a random port."

=== Back Orifice ===
Back Orifice (often shortened to BO) is a computer program designed for remote system administration. It enables a user to control a computer running Microsoft Windows operating system from a remote location. The name is a pun on Microsoft BackOffice Server software. The program debuted at DEF CON 6 on August 1, 1998. It was the brainchild of Sir Dystic. According to the group, its purpose was to demonstrate the lack of security in Microsoft's operating system Windows 98.

=== Back Orifice 2000 ===
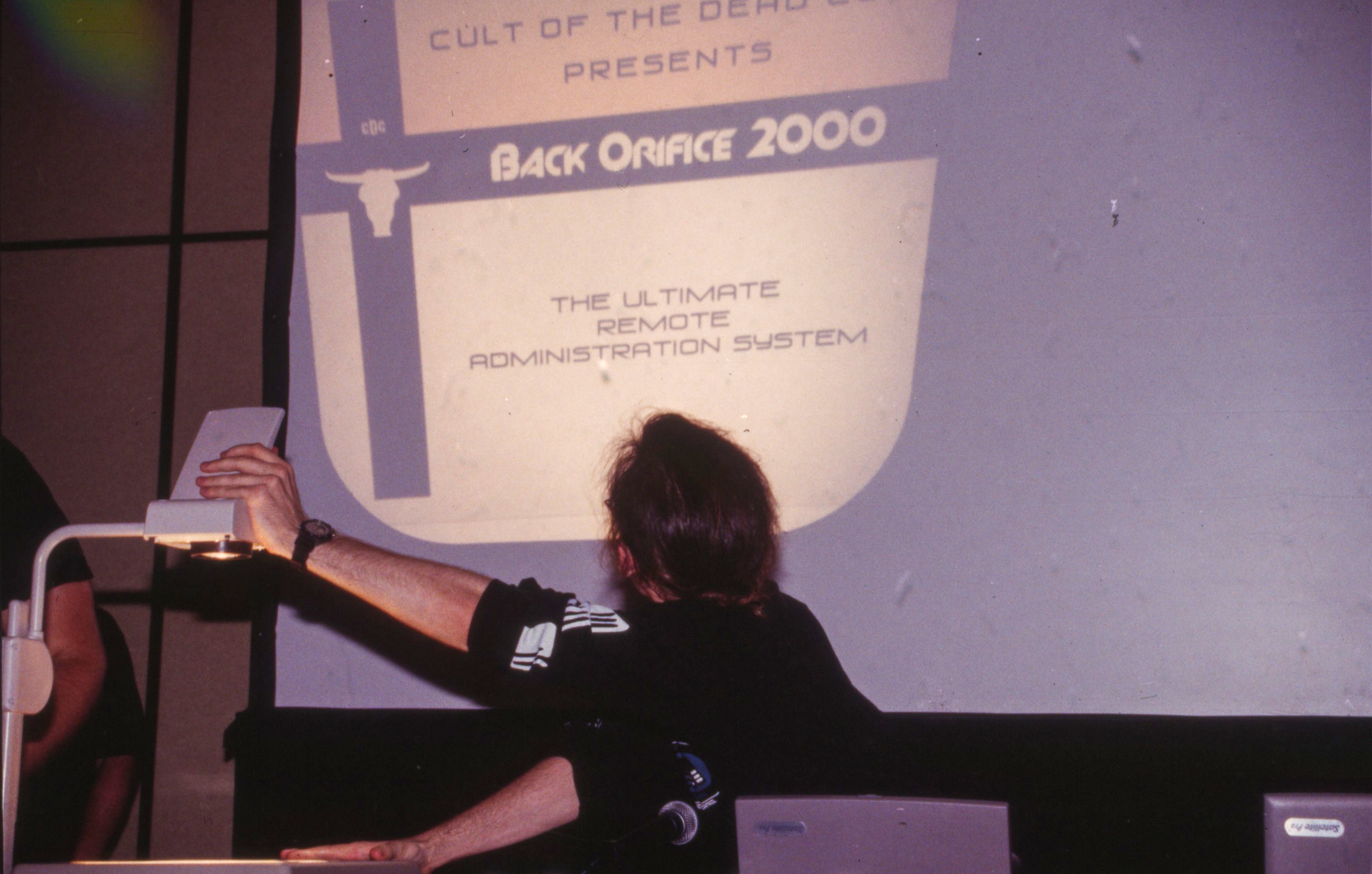
Back Orifice Release By The cDc at Defcon7

Back Orifice 2000 (often shortened to BO2k) is a computer program that is similar in function to Back Orifice. Back Orifice 2000 debuted on July 10, 1999 at DEF CON 7. The original code was written by Dildog. Whereas the original Back Orifice was limited to the Windows 95 and Windows 98 operating systems, BO2k also supports Windows NT, Windows XP and Windows 2000. Some BO2k client functionality has also been implemented for *nix-systems. In addition, BO2k was released under the GPL. As of 2012, BO2k is being actively developed.

=== Camera/Shy ===
Camera/Shy, originally called Peek-a-Booty, was the first Hacktivismo project released. It debuted in 2002 at the H.O.P.E. 2k2 convention in New York City. It is a steganographic tool that scans for and delivers decrypted content directly from the world wide web.

=== NBName ===
NBName is a computer program that can be used to carry out denial-of-service attacks that can disable NetBIOS services on Windows machines. It was written by Sir Dystic and released July 29, 2000 at the DEF CON 8 convention in Las Vegas.

=== ScatterChat ===
ScatterChat is an encrypted instant messaging client based on Gaim. It was written by J. Salvatore Testa II and released at the H.O.P.E. Number Six conference in New York City on July 22, 2006. It provides encryption as well as integrated onion routing with Tor, and secure file transfers. Various flaws in the software have been elaborated by researchers.

=== The Six/Four System ===
The Six/Four System is a censorship-resistant network proxy written by Mixter, a member of both cDc and Hacktivismo. It works by using "trusted peers" to relay network connections over SSL encrypted links. Hacktivismo and the cDc further gained notoriety in 2003 when the Six/Four System became the first product of a hacker group to receive approval from the United States Department of Commerce for export of strong encryption.

=== SMBRelay and SMBRelay2 ===
SMBRelay and SMBRelay2 are computer programs that can be used to carry out SMB man-in-the-middle attacks on Windows machines. They were written by Sir Dystic and released March 21, 2001 at the @lantacon convention in Atlanta, Georgia.

=== Torpark ===
XeroBank Browser (formerly known as Torpark) is a variant of the Portable Firefox web browser with Tor built into it. Torpark is intended for use on portable media such as a USB flash drive but it can also be used on any hard disk drive. cDc/Hacktivismo co-released v.1.5.0.7 along with Steve Topletz on September 19, 2006.

=== Veilid ===
Veilid is a peer-to-peer network and application framework, described as "like Tor, but for apps". It was released on August 11, 2023 at DEF CON 31 in Las Vegas.

=== Whisker ===
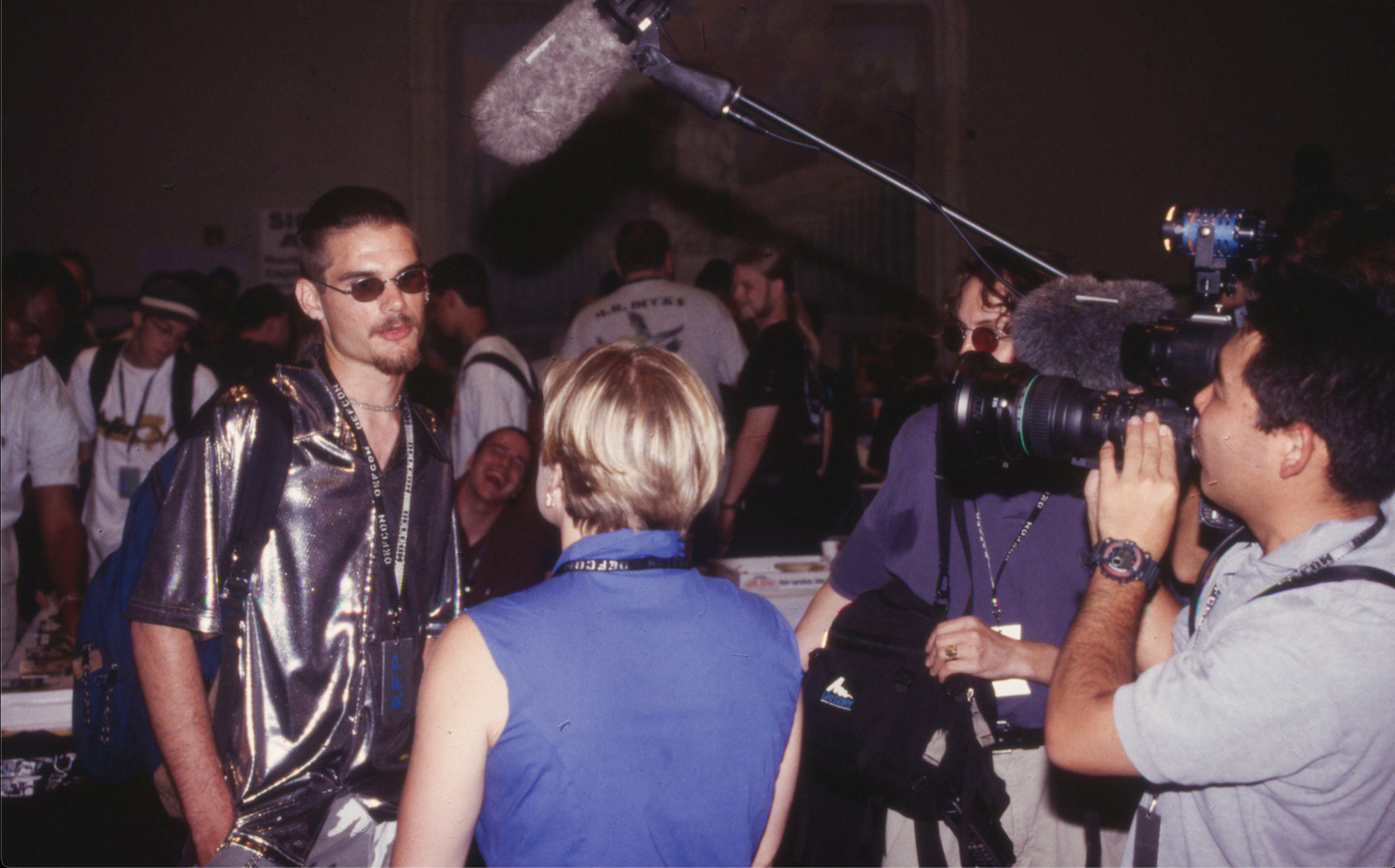
RFP talking to some journalists at Defcon 7 in 1999.

Whisker is a project authored by Rain Forest Puppy that is no longer in development. It checked for thousands of known security vulnerabilities in web servers. Whisker Version 1.4 was co-released by the cDc at DEF CON 8 in 2000.

== See also ==
- 2600: The Hacker Quarterly
- Chaos Computer Club
- DEADBEEF
- H.O.P.E.
- Legion of Doom
- Masters of Deception
- Operation Cybersnare
- Phrack
- uXu
