= Hacktivism =

Computer-based activities as a means of protest

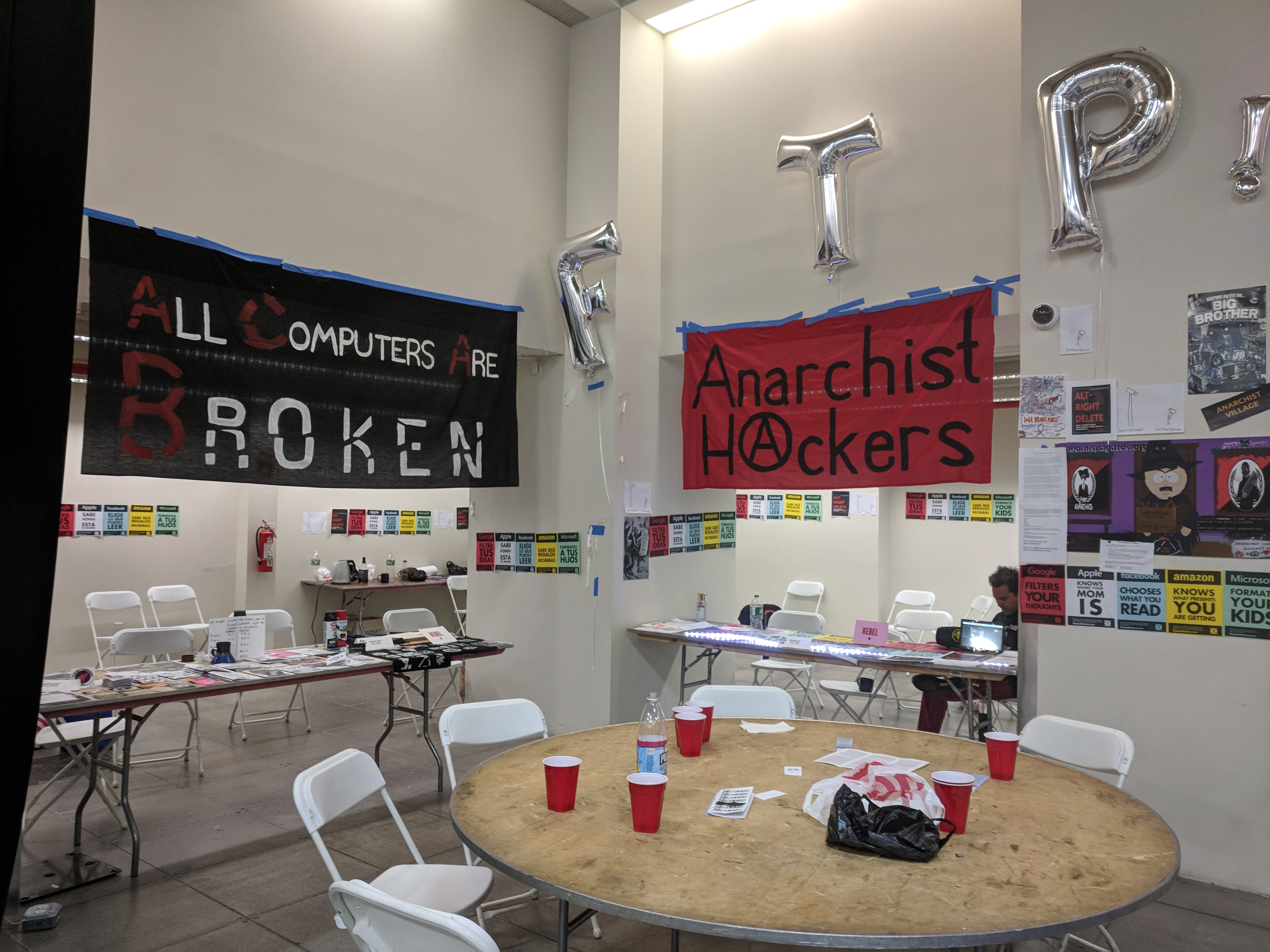
Anarchist hacker village at the Hackers On Planet Earth (HOPE) conference in 2018

Hacktivism (or hactivism; a portmanteau of hack and activism) is the use of computer-based techniques such as hacking as a form of civil disobedience to promote a political agenda or social change. A form of Internet activism with roots in hacker culture and hacker ethics, its ends are often related to free speech, human rights, or freedom of information movements.

Hacktivist activities span many political ideals and issues. Hacking as a form of activism can be carried out by a singular activist or through a network of activists, such as Anonymous and WikiLeaks, working in collaboration toward common goals without an overarching authority figure. For context, according to a statement by the U.S. Justice Department, Julian Assange, the founder of WikiLeaks, plotted with hackers connected to the "Anonymous" and "LulzSec" groups, who have been linked to multiple cyberattacks worldwide. In 2012, Assange, who was being held in the United Kingdom on a request for extradition from the United States, gave the head of LulzSec a list of targets to hack and informed him that the most significant leaks of compromised material would come from the National Security Agency, the Central Intelligence Agency, or the New York Times.

"Hacktivism" is a controversial term with several meanings. The word was coined to characterize electronic direct action as working toward social change by combining programming skills with critical thinking. But just as hack can sometimes mean cyber crime, hacktivism can be used to mean activism that is malicious, destructive, and undermining the security of the Internet as a technical, economic, and political platform. In comparison to previous forms of social activism, hacktivism has had unprecedented success, bringing in more participants, using more tools, and having more influence in that it has the ability to alter elections, begin conflicts, and take down businesses.

According to the United States 2020–2022 Counterintelligence Strategy, in addition to state adversaries and transnational criminal organizations, "ideologically motivated entities such as hacktivists, leaktivists, and public disclosure organizations, also pose significant threats".

== Origins and definitions ==
Writer Jason Sack first used the term hacktivism in a 1995 article in conceptualizing New Media artist Shu Lea Cheang's film Fresh Kill. In the story, Sack writes "An environment in which the inability to access the media of change causes the uprising of low-fi activism and hacker mentality, or "hacktivism" if you will." However, the term is frequently attributed to the Cult of the Dead Cow (cDc) member "Omega," who used it in a 1996 e-mail to the group. Due to the variety of meanings of its root words, the definition of hacktivism is nebulous and there exists significant disagreement over the kinds of activities and purposes it encompasses. Some definitions include acts of cyberterrorism while others simply reaffirm the use of technological hacking to effect social change.

== Forms and methods ==
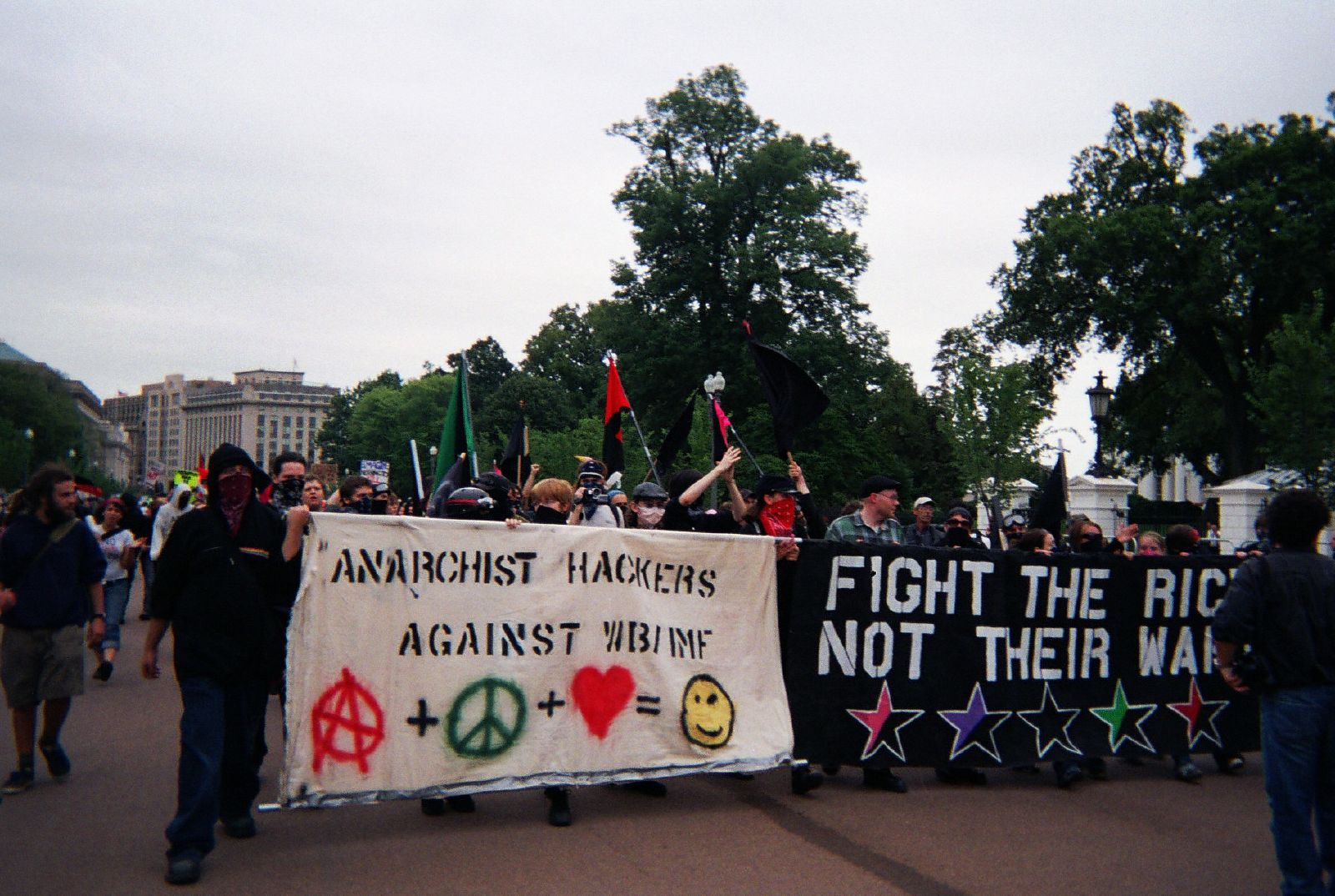
Hacktivist protest in the US

Self-proclaimed "hacktivists" often work anonymously, sometimes operating in groups while other times operating as a lone wolf with several cyber-personas all corresponding to one activist within the cyberactivism umbrella that has been gaining public interest and power in pop culture. Hacktivists generally operate under apolitical ideals and express uninhibited ideas or abuse without being scrutinized by society while representing or defending themselves publicly under an anonymous identity giving them a sense of power in the cyberactivism community.

In order to carry out their operations, hacktivists might create new tools, or integrate or use a variety of software tools readily available on the Internet. One class of hacktivist activities is increasing the accessibility of others to take politically motivated action online.

Repertoire of contention of hacktivism includes among others:

- Code: Software and websites can achieve political goals. For example, the encryption software PGP can be used to secure communications; PGP's author, Phil Zimmermann said he distributed it first to the peace movement. Jim Warren suggests PGP's wide dissemination was in response to Senate Bill 266, authored by Senators Biden and DeConcini, which demanded that "communications systems permit the government to obtain the plain text contents of voice, data, and other communications". WikiLeaks is an example of a politically motivated website: it seeks to "keep governments open".
- Mirroring: Website mirroring is used as a circumvention tool in order to bypass various censorship blocks on websites. This technique copies the contents of a censored website and disseminates it on other domains and sub-domains that are not censored. Document mirroring, similar to website mirroring, is a technique that focuses on backing up various documents and other works. RECAP is software that was written with the purpose to 'liberate US case law' and make it openly available online. The software project takes the form of distributed document collection and archival. Major mirroring projects include initiatives such as the Internet Archive and Wikisource.
- Anonymity: A method of speaking out to a wide audience about human rights issues, government oppression, etc. that utilizes various web tools such as free and/or disposable email accounts, IP masking, and blogging software to preserve a high level of anonymity.
- Doxing: The practice in which private and/or confidential documents and records are hacked into and made public. Hacktivists see this as a form of assured transparency, experts claim it is harassment.
- Denial-of-service attacks: These attacks, commonly referred to as DoS attacks, use large arrays of personal and public computers that hackers take control of via malware executable files usually transmitted through email attachments or website links. After taking control, these computers act like a herd of zombies, redirecting their network traffic to one website, with the intention of overloading servers and taking a website offline.
- Virtual sit-ins: Similar to DoS attacks but executed by individuals rather than software, a large number of protesters visit a targeted website and rapidly load pages to overwhelm the site with network traffic to slow the site or take it offline.
- Website defacements: Hackers infiltrate a web server to replace a specific web page with one of their own, usually to convey a specific message.
- Website redirects: This method involves changing the address of a website within the server so would-be visitors of the site are redirected to a site created by the perpetrator, typically to denounce the original site.
- Geo-bombing: A technique in which netizens add a geo-tag while editing YouTube videos so that the location of the video can be seen in Google Earth.
- Protestware: The use of malware to promote a social cause or protest. Protestware is self-inflicted by a project's maintainer in order to spread a message, most commonly in a disruptive manner. The term was popularized during the Russo-Ukrainian War after the peacenotwar supply chain attack on the npm ecosystem.

== Controversy ==
Depending on who is using the term, hacktivism can be a politically motivated technology hack, a constructive form of anarchic civil disobedience, or an undefined anti-systemic gesture. It can signal anticapitalist or political protest; it can denote anti-spam activists, security experts, or open-source advocates.

Some people describing themselves as hacktivists have taken to defacing websites for political reasons, such as attacking and defacing websites of governments and those who oppose their ideology. Others, such as Oxblood Ruffin (the "foreign affairs minister" of Cult of the Dead Cow and Hacktivismo), have argued forcefully against definitions of hacktivism that include web defacements or denial-of-service attacks.

Hacktivism is often seen as shadowy due to its anonymity, commonly attributed to the work of fringe groups and outlying members of society. The lack of responsible parties to be held accountable for the social-media attacks performed by hactivists has created implications in corporate and federal security measures both on and offline.

Following denial-of-service attacks by Anonymous on multiple sites, in reprisal for the apparent suppression of WikiLeaks, John Perry Barlow, a founding member of the EFF, said, "I support freedom of expression, no matter whose, so I oppose DDoS attacks regardless of their target... they're the poison gas of cyberspace". On the other hand, Jay Leiderman, an attorney for many hacktivists, argues that DDoS can be a legitimate form of protest speech in situations that are reasonably limited in time, place and manner.

== Notable hacktivist events ==
- The Cult of the Dead Cow announces the existence of the Hong Kong Blondes, a supposed group of Chinese dissident hackers working to undermine internet censorship in the PRC. Though widely reported and discussed at high levels of the U.S. government, the group was later revealed to be a fabrication intended to draw attention to digital repression and possibly to provide cover for the extraction of Chinese activists.
- In 1996, the title of the United States Department of Justice's homepage was changed to "Department of Injustice". Pornographic images were also added to the homepage to protest the Communications Decency Act.
- In 1998, members of the Electronic Disturbance Theater created FloodNet, a web tool that allowed users to participate in DDoS attacks (or what they called electronic civil disobedience) in support of Zapatista rebels in Chiapas.
- In December 1998, a hacktivist group from the US called Legions of the Underground emerged. They declared a cyberwar against Iraq and China and planned on disabling internet access in retaliation for the countries' human rights abuses. Opposing hackers criticized this move by Legions of the Underground, saying that by shutting down internet systems, the hacktivist group would have no impact on providing free access to information.
- In July 2001, Hacktivismo, a sect of the Cult of the Dead Cow, issued the "Hacktivismo Declaration". This served as a code of conduct for those participating in hacktivism, and declared the hacker community's goals of stopping "state-sponsored censorship of the Internet" as well as affirming the rights of those therein to "freedom of opinion and expression".
- During the 2009 Iranian election protests, Anonymous played a role in disseminating information to and from Iran by setting up the website Anonymous Iran; they also released a video manifesto to the Iranian government.
- Google worked with engineers from SayNow and Twitter to provide communications for the Egyptian people in response to the government sanctioned Internet blackout during the 2011 protests. The result, Speak To Tweet, was a service in which voicemail left by phone was then tweeted via Twitter with a link to the voice message on Google's SayNow.
- On Saturday 29 May 2010 a hacker calling himself 'Kaka Argentine' hacked into the Ugandan State House website and posted a conspicuous picture of Adolf Hitler with the swastika, a Nazi Party symbol.
- During the Egyptian Internet black out, January 28 – February 2, 2011, Telecomix provided dial up services, and technical support for the Egyptian people. Telecomix released a video stating their support of the Egyptian people, describing their efforts to provide dial-up connections, and offering methods to avoid internet filters and government surveillance. The hacktivist group also announced that they were closely tracking radio frequencies in the event that someone was sending out important messages.
- Project Chanology, also known as "Operation Chanology", was a hacktivist protest against the Church of Scientology to punish the church for participating in Internet censorship relating to the removal of material from a 2008 interview with Church of Scientology member Tom Cruise. Hacker group Anonymous attempted to "expel the church from the Internet" via DDoS attacks. In February 2008 the movement shifted toward legal methods of nonviolent protesting. Several protests were held as part of Project Chanology, beginning in 2008 and ending in 2009.
- On June 3, 2011, LulzSec took down a website of the FBI. This was the first time they had targeted a website that was not part of the private sector. That week, the FBI was able to track the leader of LulzSec, Hector Xavier Monsegur.
- On June 20, 2011, LulzSec targeted the Serious Organised Crime Agency of the United Kingdom, causing UK authorities to take down the website.
- In August 2011 a member of Anonymous working under the name "Oliver Tucket" took control of the Syrian Defense Ministry website and added an Israeli government web portal in addition to changing the mail server for the website to one belonging to the Chinese navy.
- Anonymous and New World Hackers claimed responsibility for the 2016 Dyn cyberattack in retaliation for Ecuador's rescinding Internet access to WikiLeaks founder Julian Assange at their embassy in London. WikiLeaks alluded to the attack. Subsequently, FlashPoint stated that the attack was most likely done by script kiddies.
- In 2013, as an online component to the Million Mask March, Anonymous in the Philippines crashed 30 government websites and posted a YouTube video to congregate people in front of the parliament house on November 5 to demonstrate their disdain toward the Filipino government.
- In 2014, Sony Pictures Entertainment was hacked by a group by the name of Guardians of Peace (GOP), who obtained over 100 terabytes of data including unreleased films, employee salary, social security data, passwords, and account information. GOP hacked various social media accounts and hijacked them by changing their passwords to diespe123 (die sony pictures entertainment) and posting threats on the pages.
- In 2016, Turkish programmer Azer Koçulu removed his software package left-pad from npm, causing a cascading failure of other software packages that contained left-pad as a dependency. This was done after Kik, a messaging application, threatened legal action against Koçulu after he refused to rename his kik package. npm ultimately sided with Kik, prompting Koçulu to unpublish all of his packages from npm in protest, including left-pad.
- British hacker Kane Gamble, who was sentenced to two years in youth detention, posed as John Brennan, the then director of the CIA, and Mark F. Giuliano, a former deputy director of the FBI, to access highly sensitive information. The judge said Gamble engaged in "politically motivated cyber-terrorism."
- In 2021, Anonymous hacked and leaked the databases of American web hosting company Epik.
- As a response against 2022 Russian invasion of Ukraine, Anonymous performed multiple cyberattacks against Russian computer systems.
- Following the Gaza war since 2023, multiple cyberattacks attacks were seen from pro-Israel and pro-Palestine hacktivist groups. India's pro-Israel hacktivists took down the portals of Palestinian National Bank, the National Telecommunications Company and the website of Hamas. Multiple Israeli websites were flooded with malicious traffic by pro-Palestine hacktivists. Israeli newspaper The Jerusalem Post reported that its website was down due to a series of cyberattacks initiated against them.

== Notable hacktivist people/groups ==
=== WikiLeaks ===
The video released by WikiLeaks, showing the slaying of Reuters employee Namir Noor-Eldeen and a dozen other civilians by a U.S. helicopter

WikiLeaks is a media organisation and publisher founded in 2006. It operates as a non-profit and is funded by donations and media partnerships. It has published classified documents and other media provided by anonymous sources. It was founded by Julian Assange, an Australian editor, publisher, and activist, who is currently challenging extradition to the United States over his work with WikiLeaks. Since September 2018, Kristinn Hrafnsson has served as its editor-in-chief. Its website states that it has released more than ten million documents and associated analyses. WikiLeaks' most recent publication was in 2021, and its most recent publication of original documents was in 2019. Beginning in November 2022, many of the documents on the organisation's website could not be accessed.

WikiLeaks has released document caches and media that exposed serious violations of human rights and civil liberties by various governments. It released footage, which it titled Collateral Murder, of the 12 July 2007 Baghdad airstrike, in which Iraqi Reuters journalists and several civilians were killed by a U.S. helicopter crew. WikiLeaks has also published leaks such as diplomatic cables from the United States and Saudi Arabia, emails from the governments of Syria and Turkey, corruption in Kenya and at Samherji. WikiLeaks has also published documents exposing cyber warfare and surveillance tools created by the CIA, and surveillance of the French president by the National Security Agency. During the 2016 U.S. presidential election campaign, WikiLeaks released emails from the Democratic National Committee (DNC) and from Hillary Clinton's campaign manager, showing that the party's national committee had effectively acted as an arm of the Clinton campaign during the primaries, seeking to undercut the campaign of Bernie Sanders. These releases resulted in the resignation of the chairwoman of the DNC and caused significant harm to the Clinton campaign. During the campaign, WikiLeaks promoted false conspiracy theories about Hillary Clinton, the Democratic Party and the murder of Seth Rich.

WikiLeaks has won a number of awards and has been commended for exposing state and corporate secrets, increasing transparency, assisting freedom of the press, and enhancing democratic discourse while challenging powerful institutions. WikiLeaks and some of its supporters say the organisation's publications have a perfect record of publishing authentic documents. The organisation has been the target of campaigns to discredit it, including aborted ones by Palantir and HBGary. WikiLeaks has also had its donation systems disrupted by problems with its payment processors. As a result, the Wau Holland Foundation helps process WikiLeaks' donations.

The organisation has been criticised for inadequately curating some of its content and violating the personal privacy of individuals. WikiLeaks has, for instance, revealed Social Security numbers, medical information, credit card numbers and details of suicide attempts. News organisations, activists, journalists and former members have also criticised the organisation over allegations of anti-Clinton and pro-Trump bias, various associations with the Russian government, buying and selling of leaks, and a lack of internal transparency. Journalists have also criticised the organisation for promotion of false flag conspiracy theories, and what they describe as exaggerated and misleading descriptions of the contents of leaks. The CIA defined the organisation as a "non-state hostile intelligence service" after the release of Vault 7.

=== Anonymous ===
Perhaps the most well known hacktivist group, Anonymous has been prominent and prevalent in many major online hacks over the past decade. Anonymous is a decentralized group that originated on the forums of 4chan during 2003, but didn't rise to prominence until 2008 when they directly attacked the Church of Scientology in a massive DoS attack. Since then, Anonymous has participated in a great number of online projects such as Operation: Payback and Operation: Safe Winter. However, while a great number of their projects have been regarded as for charitable cause, they gained notoriety from the media due to the nature of their work mostly consisting of illegal hacking.

Following the Paris terror attacks in 2015, Anonymous posted a video declaring war on ISIS, the terror group that claimed responsibility for the attacks. Since declaring war on ISIS, Anonymous since identified several Twitter accounts associated with the movement in order to stop the distribution of ISIS propaganda. However, Anonymous fell under heavy criticism when Twitter issued a statement calling the lists Anonymous had compiled "wildly inaccurate," as it contained accounts of journalists and academics rather than members of ISIS.

Anonymous has also been involved with the Black Lives Matter movement. Early in July 2015, a rumor circulated that Anonymous was calling for a Day of Rage protests in retaliation for the shootings of Alton Sterling and Philando Castile, which would entail violent protests and riots. This rumor was based on a video that was not posted with the official Anonymous YouTube account. None of the Twitter accounts associated with Anonymous had tweeted anything in relation to a Day of Rage, and the rumors were identical to past rumors that had circulated in 2014 following the death of Mike Brown. Instead, on July 15, a Twitter account associated with Anonymous posted a series of tweets calling for a day of solidarity with the Black Lives Matter movement. The Twitter account used the hashtag "#FridayofSolidarity" to coordinate protests across the nation, and emphasized the fact that the Friday of Solidarity was intended for peaceful protests. The account also stated that the group was unaware of any Day of Rage plans.

In February 2017 the group took down more than 10,000 sites on the dark web related to child porn.

=== DkD[|| ===
DkD[||, a French cyberhacktivist, was arrested by the OCLCTIC (office central de lutte contre la criminalité liée aux technologies de l’information et de la communication), in March 2003. DkD[|| defaced more than 2000 pages, many of them governments and US military sites. Eric Voulleminot of the Regional Service of Judicial Police in Lille classified the young hacker as "the most wanted hacktivist in France".

DkD[|| was a very known defacer in the underground for his political view, doing his defacements for various political reasons. In response to his arrest, The Ghost Boys defaced many navy.mil sites using the “Free DkD[||!!” slogan.

=== LulzSec ===
In May 2011, five members of Anonymous formed the hacktivist group Lulz Security, otherwise known as LulzSec. LulzSec's name originated from the conjunction of the internet slang term "lulz", meaning laughs, and "sec", meaning security. The group members used specific handles to identify themselves on Internet Relay Channels, the most notable being: "Sabu," "Kayla," "T-Flow," "Topiary," "AVUnit," and "Pwnsauce." Though the members of LulzSec would spend up to 20 hours a day in communication, they did not know one another personally, nor did they share personal information. For example, once the members' identities were revealed, "T-Flow" was revealed to be 15 years old. Other members, on the basis of his advanced coding ability, thought he was around 30 years old.

One of the first notable targets that LulzSec pursued was HBGary, which was performed in response to a claim made by the technology security company that it had identified members of Anonymous. Following this, the members of LulzSec targeted an array of companies and entities, including but not limited to Fox Television, Tribune Company, PBS, Sony, Nintendo, and the Senate.gov website. The targeting of these entities typically involved gaining access to and downloading confidential user information, or defacing the website at hand. While not as strongly political as WikiLeaks or Anonymous, LulzSec shared similar sentiments for the freedom of information. One of their distinctly politically driven attacks involved targeting the Arizona State Police in response to new immigration laws.

The group's first attack that garnered significant government attention was in 2011, when they collectively took down a website of the FBI. Following the incident, the leader of LulzSec, "Sabu," was identified as Hector Xavier Monsegur by the FBI, and he was the first of the group to be arrested. Immediately following his arrest, Monsegur admitted to criminal activity. He then began his cooperation with the US government, helping FBI authorities to arrest 8 of his co-conspirators, prevent 300 potential cyber attacks, and helped to identify vulnerabilities in existing computer systems. In August 2011, Monsegur pleaded guilty to "computer hacking conspiracy, computer hacking, computer hacking in furtherance of fraud, conspiracy to commit access device fraud, conspiracy to commit bank fraud, and aggravated identity theft pursuant to a cooperation agreement with the government." He served a total of one year and seven months and was charged a $1,200 fine.

=== SiegedSec ===
SiegedSec, short for Sieged Security and commonly self-referred to as the "Gay Furry Hackers", is a black-hat criminal hacktivist group that was formed in early 2022, that has committed a number of high-profile cyber attacks, including attacks on NATO, The Idaho National Laboratory, and Real America's Voice. On July 10, 2024, the group announced that they would be disbanding after attacking The Heritage Foundation.

SiegedSec is led by an individual under the alias "vio". Short for "Sieged Security", SiegedSec's Telegram channel was created in April 2022, and they commonly refer to themselves as "gay furry hackers". On multiple occasions, the group has targeted right-wing movements through breaching data, including The Heritage Foundation, Real America's Voice, and various U.S. states that have pursued legislation against gender-affirming care.

=== maia arson crimew ===
maia arson crimew, born Tillie Kottmann, is a Swiss hacker and software developer. Her most prominent acts of hacktivism are her involvement in the 2021 Verkada hack and her leaking of a version of the United States No Fly List in 2023; while the first was done as part of the group "APT - 69420 Arson Cats", she acted as a lone agent in the second. She was indicted by the United States District Court for the Western District of Washington for her involvement in several major hacks from 2019-2021, excluding the Verkada hack, leading to her and her parents' homes being raided by the Swiss police and her website "git.rip", which hosted images taken from some of the compromised Verkada cameras, being seized by the FBI.

== Related practices ==
=== Culture jamming ===
Hacking has been sometimes described as a form of culture jamming, the practice of subverting and criticizing political messages and media culture with the aim of challenging the status quo. It is often targeted toward subliminal thought processes taking place in the viewers with the goal of raising awareness as well as causing a paradigm shift. Culture jamming takes many forms including billboard hacking, broadcast signal intrusion, ad hoc art performances, simulated legal transgressions, memes, and artivism.

The term "culture jamming" was coined in 1984 by American musician Donald Joyce of the band Negativland. However, some speculation remains as to when the practice of culture jamming began. Social researcher Vince Carducci believes culture jamming can be traced back to the 1950s, with European social activist group Situationist International. Author and cultural critic Mark Dery believes medieval carnival is the earliest form of culture jamming as a way to subvert the social hierarchy at the time.

=== Media hacking ===
Media hacking is the usage of various electronic media in an innovative or otherwise abnormal fashion for the purpose of conveying a message to as large a number of people as possible, primarily achieved via the World Wide Web. A popular and effective means of media hacking is posting on a blog, as one is usually controlled by one or more independent individuals, uninfluenced by outside parties. The concept of social bookmarking, as well as Web-based Internet forums, may cause such a message to be seen by users of other sites as well, increasing its total reach.

Media hacking is commonly employed for political purposes, by both political parties and political dissidents. In the 2008 US Election, in which both the Democratic and Republican parties used a wide variety of different media in order to convey relevant messages to an increasingly Internet-oriented audience. At the same time, political dissidents used blogs and other social media like Twitter in order to reply on an individual basis to the presidential candidates. In particular, sites like Twitter are proving important means in gauging popular support for the candidates, though the site is often used for dissident purposes rather than a show of positive support.

Mobile technology has also become subject to media hacking for political purposes. SMS has been widely used by political dissidents as a means of quickly and effectively organising smart mobs for political action. This has been most effective in the Philippines, where SMS media hacking has twice had a significant impact on whether or not the country's Presidents are elected or removed from office.

==== In fiction ====
The 1999 science fiction-action film The Matrix, among others, popularized the simulation hypothesis — the suggestion that reality is in fact a simulation of which those affected by the simulants are generally unaware. In this context, "reality hacking" is reading and understanding the code which represents the activity of the simulated reality environment (such as Matrix digital rain) and also modifying it in order to bend the laws of physics or otherwise modify the simulated reality.

Reality hacking as a mystical practice is explored in the Gothic-punk aesthetics-inspired White Wolf urban fantasy role-playing game Mage: The Ascension. In the game, the Reality Coders (also known as Reality Hackers or Reality Crackers) are a faction within the Virtual Adepts, a secret society of mages whose magick revolves around digital technology.

In a location-based game (also known as a pervasive game), reality hacking refers to tapping into phenomena that exist in the real world, and tying them into the game story universe.

== See also ==
- Crypto-anarchism
- Cyberterrorism
- E-democracy
- Open-source governance
- Patriotic hacking
- Tactical media
- 1984 Network Liberty Alliance
- Chaos Computer Club
- Cicada 3301
- Decocidio
- Jester
- Internet vigilantism
- The Internet's Own Boy: The Story of Aaron Swartz – a documentary film
- milw0rm
- 2600: The Hacker Quarterly
- Citizen Lab
- HackThisSite
- Cypherpunk
- Jeremy Hammond
- Mr. Robot – a television series
