= Soulz at Zero =

Electronic literary art group

Soulz at Zero (SAZ) was a lit group formed in 1994 by Jack Flack (Rob O'Hara) and The Stranger (Stephen Alba). SAZ released 25 monthly packs over a period of two years, beginning in September 1994 and ending in September 1996. The group took its name from a Souls at Zero poster Flack had in his bedroom at the time, with the trailing "s" in "Souls" changed to a "z". Soulz at Zero was so well known that their name was added to the "Elite Acronym List," which was used to separate "lamers" from "elite users."

In the 1990s, several ANSI art groups began including "lits" (electronic literary art) in their packs. Expanding on that idea, Soulz at Zero became the first dedicated online lit group. Each Soulz at Zero pack contained several original horror-themed poems and short stories. Each pack also contained an issue of "The Death Certificate," an original nonfiction magazine which included horror-related news, articles, book and movie reviews, and interviews. Soulz at Zero's innovation was the addition of ANSI artwork, color, and VGA graphics, although the focus of the group was focused on original fiction. The packs were designed to be viewed with an included viewer, which no longer runs on modern operating systems.

Soulz at Zero packs were distributed via BBS. Each month, readers could download new SAZ packs from either Where Shadows Wait (WHQ, run by The Stranger) or The Gas Chamber (US HQ, run by Jack Flack). As popularity of the group grew, so did its number of distribution sites. Before its demise, SAZ had member boards in over a dozen states and several countries including Canada and Portugal. With the introduction and growing popularity of the World Wide Web to the masses, Soulz at Zero slowly began to make the transition from the BBS world to the web. SAZ eventually added a web site and an FTP site to its official distribution points. In September 1996 Soulz at Zero released its last pack and disbanded, citing burnout and a general lack of public feedback/interest.

In 2002, online lit group Candelabra (CND) released a Soulz at Zero spotlight that included new work from former members of SAZ, along with audio (mp3) readings, audio commentaries, and an audio history of the group as told by Jack Flack and The Stranger. The audio history was reused in the Soulz at Zero episode of You Don't Know Flack.

== Packs ==
Each Soulz at Zero pack consisted of four types of original files: poetry, short stories, multimedia files, and the Death Certificate. Poems were usually non-rhyming, horror themed, and contained ANSI color. Short Stories were also horror related, but usually did not contain any ANSI color enhancements. Media Files included VGA pictures and occasionally WAV files. This was done as an attempt to win cross-over fans from the ANSI art. The Death Certificate was The Stranger's monthly non-fiction horror newsletter, which contained reviews and interviews.

== Members ==
Soulz at Zero was founded by Jack Flack and The Stranger, who formed a friendship in high school over their common interests in heavy metal music and horror books and movies.

Jack Flack (Rob O'Hara) was an original member of TBH405 (The Brotherhood of 405) and founded SiTH (Sick in the Head) e-zine. O'Hara has written articles for IGN, 2600: The Hacker Quarterly, the Cult of the Dead Cow, and contributed to the O'Reilly book Retro Gaming Hacks. Flack has self-published two books, Commodork: Sordid Tales from a BBS Junkie and Invading Spaces: A Beginner's Guide to Collecting Arcade Games. Flack blogs regularly at RobOHara.com.

The Stranger (Stephen Alba) has self-published several books through Lulu and is currently a second grade teacher at Northridge Elementary in the Putnam City School District.

The first of several SAZ packs consisted of only Jack Flack and The Stranger. The next two members to be added were Black Sunshine and Deranged.
