= Hugh Gallagher (humorist) =

American humorist

Hugh Gallagher is an author and musician from New York City. He is best known for his satire, including his band Von Von Von, his award-winning satire on the college application essay, "3A Essay", and the novel Teeth.

== Early life and career ==
Gallagher was born in New York City and grew up in Pennsylvania. While in high school, he won Scholastic Press, Inc.'s national writing contest in 1990 with a satiric personal essay titled "3A Essay".

The essay starts with "I am a dynamic figure", and contains many humorous, hyperbolic statements of his accomplishments, ending with the line, "But I have not yet gone to college." The essay, which he did apparently submit to some colleges, has become an urban legend among high school students undergoing the college admissions process. It also became a popular Internet phenomenon in the late 1990s. The essay was also recorded as a spoken-word piece by Gang of Seven Productions.

Gallagher ultimately attended NYU. While there, he released a spoken-word/comedy album under the name Hugh Brown Shu in 1992, entitled "Bomb the Womb."

== Other work ==
In 1998, Gallagher published his first novel, Teeth.

Since 2002, he has performed live as Von Von Von, a pop star holdover from the 1980s who hails from Antwerp. Some of Gallagher/Von Von Von's work has been produced by Grandmaster Ratte' of Cult of the Dead Cow.
