= Alliance for Young Artists & Writers =

Nonprofit sponsor of the Scholastic Art & Writing Awards

The Alliance for Young Artists & Writers is a nonprofit organization which manages the annual Scholastic Art & Writing Awards, a competition that recognizes talented young artists and writers from across the United States.

== Scholastic Art & Writing Awards ==
The competition begins at a regional level, with students receiving a variety of regional awards. Some of these awards include an "Honorable Mention", "Silver Key", "Gold Key", and "The American Visions Award". The submissions which receive "Gold Key" awards are then judged at the national level. Additionally, only five students in Art or Writing are nominated for "The American Visions Award".

== History ==
In 1923, Maurice R. Robinson, of Scholastic Corporation established the Scholastic Awards.

In 1994, the Alliance for Young Artists & Writers was established to administer the Awards.

== Scholarships ==
Exceptional artwork and literature submitted to the Scholastic Art & Writing Awards are awarded scholarships. Scholarships usually include monetary prizes as well as free or reduced-tuition art and writing programs. The 2021 scholarships include: Best-in-Grade Award, Civic Expression Award, New York Life Award, One Earth Award, Portfolio Awards, The Alliance/ACT-SO Journey Award, The Herblock Award for Editorial Cartoon, and Ray Bradbury Award for Science Fiction & Fantasy.

== National Student Poets Program ==
The program links the National Student Poets with audiences and neighborhood resources such as museums and libraries, and other community-anchor institutions and builds upon the Alliance for Young Artists & Writers' long-standing work with educators and creative teens through the prestigious Scholastic Art & Writing Awards. The Poets’ appointment events are hosted in cooperation with the Library of Congress in Washington, D.C., and held in conjunction with the National Book Festival.

== Jurors ==
The selection panels for both regional and national levels of the Scholastic Art & Writing Awards are composed of artists, writers, curators, critics, educators, and professionals from the nation’s leading creative industries, some of whom are alums of the Scholastic Awards. Notable past jurors include Robert Frost, Langston Hughes, David Sedaris, Judy Blume, Bill Murray, Philip-Lorca diCorcia, Mary Ellen Mark, William Saroyan, Sergio Troncoso, Frank McCourt, Kiki Smith, George Plimpton, Esmeralda Santiago, Tatiana von Fürstenberg, Madeleine L’Engle, Faith Ringgold, Billy Collins, Edward Sorel, Edwidge Danticat, Donald Lipski, Carolyn Forché, Ned Vizzini, and Michael Bierut. Panelists look for works that best exemplify originality, technical skill, and the emergence of a personal voice or vision.

== Notable alumni ==
- Richard Anuszkiewicz
- Alan Arkin
- Richard Avedon
- John Baldessari
- Kevin Bales
- Peter Beagle
- Harry Bertoia
- Michael Bierut
- Mel Bochner
- Garrett Børns
- Stan Brakhage
- Ken Burns
- Truman Capote
- John Currin
- Maureen Daly
- Paul Brooks Davis
- Joe DiPietro
- Lena Dunham
- Abdi Farah
- Frances Farmer
- Carolyn Forché
- Hugh Gallagher
- Myla Goldberg
- Red Grooms
- Richard Haas
- Erik Madigan Heck
- Robert Indiana
- Luis Jiménez
- Jaida Jones
- Ezra Jack Keats
- Stephen King
- Jacob Landau
- Hughie Lee-Smith
- Richard Linklater
- Donald Lipski
- John Lithgow
- Bernard Malamud
- Joyce Maynard
- Robert McCloskey
- Sue Miller
- Audrey Niffenegger
- Ryan Jude Novelline
- Joyce Carol Oates
- Tom Otterness
- Gary Panter
- Philip Pearlstein
- Sylvia Plath
- Zac Posen
- Robert Redford
- Thane Rosenbaum
- David Salle
- John Howard Sanden
- Winfield Townley Scott
- Mason Shefa
- Edward Sorel
- Jean Stafford
- Robert Trebor
- Cy Twombly
- John Updike
- Ned Vizzini
- Kay WalkingStick
- Andy Warhol
- Idelle Weber
- Charles White
- Terry Winters
- Roger Zelazny
