= Torrify =

Torrify may refer to:

- The process of torrefaction, a type of pyrolysis
- A historical name for the XeroBank Browser
