= TrashMail =

Disposable e-mail address service

TrashMail is a free disposable e-mail address service created in 2002 by Stephan Ferraro, a computer science student at Epitech Paris which belongs now to Ferraro Ltd. The service provides temporary email addresses that can be abandoned if they start receiving email spam. It mainly forwards emails to a real hidden email address.

== Description ==
TrashMail receives emails and forwards them to a real hidden email address. On account creation there is the option to set a number of total forwards and a date when the disposable email expires. For each forwarded email the counter is decreased by 1. When the counter reaches 0 or the date limit is expired then the temporary email address will be deleted. After the temporary email address is deleted, any incoming email is rejected by the SMTP code 550 5.1.1. TrashMail also provides a free open-source add-on for Mozilla Firefox available from the official store. The email registration and community forum are provided by HTTPS (SSL over HTTP) access to protect privacy. Additionally the SMTP server communication has TLS enabled by default.

As many spammers rely on harvested email addresses, the best method of avoiding spam is not to publish one's real email address. By providing a temporary address, TrashMail allows users to protect their real email.

== Extras ==
TrashMail differs from other disposable email address services in its possibility to use the Challenge-Response System for each free disposable email address. Additionally, it provides real-time spam stats on its main page. It is possible to verify the current incoming spam amount on this site.

== Software ==
TrashMail can be used via the web. However an API is provided and documented on the forum which explains how to write custom software to use for the free service. A Mozilla Firefox add-on for the service is available.
