= 1984 Network Liberty Alliance =

1984 Network Liberty Alliance is a loose group of software programmers, artists, social activists and militants, interested in computers and networks and considering them tools to empower and link the various actors of the social movement around the world. They are part of the hacktivism movement.

== History ==
The group was formed in November 1984, during a "debriefing" workshop of the European Peace Marches on the Hartmannswillerkopf in Alsace, France, following the struggle against the installation of Pershing II and SS-20 nuclear missiles in Germany (Mutlangen). From 1978 to 1985, this European-wide peace movement had mobilized millions of citizens, protesting the arms race, the growth of military spending and joining in the Campaign for Nuclear Disarmament.

In reference to George Orwell's novel 1984 and to the Rebel Alliance of the movie Star Wars, the group chose the (ironic) name 1984 Network Liberty Alliance. Founders are André Gorz, French philosopher, Dov Lerner, MIT computer graduate and disciple of Saul Alinsky, as well as Gregoire Seither, free radio activist, Frauke Hahn who had led the woman's resistance ('Commons Women') at Greenham Common Women's Peace Camp, David Szwarc from the Israeli Peace movement and Adama Drasiweni, computer graduate from the University of London, future founder of N'DA, Africa's first independent telecom company.

Other members, like Australian co-founder of Indymedia Matthew Arnison, south-African anti-apartheid militant Peter Makema and Israeli peace activists Uri Avnery and Michel Warchawsky, joined later on. All were active in various social movements and peace initiatives in Europe and the USA.

When Richard Stallman published the GNU Manifesto in March 1985 and called for participation and support, Dov Lerner and Gregor Seither started organizing regular meetings and workshops in order to train activists in the use of information technology and gather support for the Free Software movement. Adama Drasiweni, owner of a computer business in London, set up similar workshops in Kibera, a giant slum outside of Nairobi, Kenya.

In France, the Alliance used the network of the Maisons de l'Informatique that had been set up under the presidency of François Mitterrand as well as the computer labs of Paris University, who access to academic networks and Billboard Systems. The group ran a number of BBS, among them 'Pom-Pom', devoted to the Apple Macintosh and 'PeaceNet', an "electronic pow-wow" to help social activists and community organizers exchange information around the world, offering free mail accounts and file hosting services.

Very soon the issues of free speech, software patents, civil rights and surveillance became some of the major topics addressed by the Alliance, the group being accused of hacking and forking software. One of the BBS run by the group 'Gaia rising', was accused by the German government of being a meeting point for radical environmental activists as well as anarchists.

The Liberty Alliance was particularly active in the popular worldwide resistance to Multilateral Agreement on Investments (MAI) in the mid-1990s, networking multiple groups and providing "open cyberspaces" for activists to share information and experience.

In the summer of 1998 the first alternative media centre was set up in a bus in Birmingham, United Kingdom during the Global Street Party, an international day of protest and festive actions coinciding with the 24th G8 Summit. The alternative media centres also provided interpretation and language services to international militant meetings, like during the July 1999 Global Carnival against Capitalism, or J18 London, a giant rally and party in the heart of the London City, meant as a counter-summit to the 25th G8 Summit in Köln, Germany.

Members of the team travelled to the WTO Ministerial Conference of 1999 in Seattle to set up an alternative media centre during the WTO Ministerial Conference of 1999 protest activity. The project joined with that of other media activists and, out of the necessity to bypass the corporate media and report on a WTO conference but also to show how one could bypass corporate software (Windows), the independent media agency Indymedia was born.

Language diversity and the lack of interpreters led a number of activists to start thinking about a way to help militants from around the world to bridge the language barrier. Three years later, during the 27th G8 summit in Genoa, Italy, this would lead to the creation of the Babels network of volunteer interpreters and translators for linguistic diversity and social change.

Members of the Network Liberty Alliance have worked on social IT projects in North America (San Francisco Free Software movement, Chicago community cybercenter), Central America (Nicaragua, Guatemala, Panama), the Middle-East (Egypt, Israeli Civil Administration area) as well as in the Asia Pacific region (Indonesia, Nouvelle-Calédonie, Australia, Papua Niugini) and Africa (Malawi, Mali, Cameroon).

When the Berlin Wall fell in 1989, another member of the Alliance, Stefan Ostrowsky, transferred "NET(te) Bude" (a play on the word NET like network, and 'Nette Bude', nice crashpad in German), a community IT training centre to East-Berlin, thus becoming the first 'Cybercafe' behind the iron curtain.

== See also ==
- milw0rm
- Anti-nuclear movement
