= Mason Shefa =

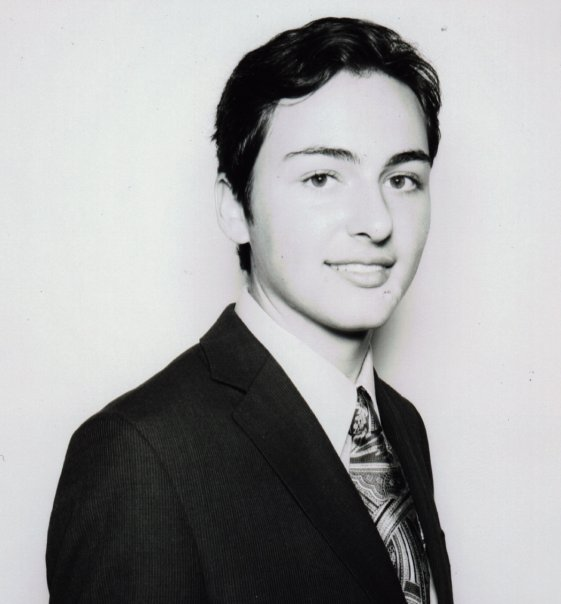
- (2010)
- Born: Mason Chadwick Shefa; May 28, 1993 (age 33); Minneapolis, Minnesota, U.S.
- Known for: Experimental film, sacred music

Mason Chadwick Shefa (/ˈʃɛfə/ SHEF-ə; born May 28, 1993) is an avant-garde filmmaker and sacred music composer based in Studio City, California. He graduated from Yale University in 2015. For his films, Shefa utilizes film formats such as Super-8 and 16mm. In 2016, Shefa published a 248-page collection of his sacred works for a cappella chorus, entitled The First Book of Music: Containing Anthems, Motets, Hymn Tunes, Chants, and Services for the Various Seasons of the Church Year.

In May 2011, Shefa received the National Gold Medal at the 2011 Scholastic Art and Writing Awards, held in Carnegie Hall, for his portfolio of eight experimental films. Shefa's films have also been recognized with honors from the National Foundation for Advancement in the Arts, the 2009 and 2011 Los Angeles Film Festival, the University of Southern California’s Los Angeles Student Film Institute, the Danville International Children’s Film Festival, L.A.’s FilmFest 43, the Harvard-Westlake Film Festival, the South Bay Student Video Festival, and the Spotlight The Arts festival in Calabasas, California.

In September 2012, singer/songwriter Lana Del Rey obtained permission to incorporate Shefa's film, Psalm 51, in her iTunes Festival concert in London, United Kingdom.

In February 2015, Shefa was a member of the judges panel of the "concorso internazionale di cortometraggi" category of the 2015 Lucca Film Festival.

== Filmography ==
- The Balloon That Almost Got Away (2003)
- Transportation (2003)
- Danger on the Tracks (2003)
- When the Lights Went Out (2004)
- Imagine (2006)
- Memories of an Undefined Image (2007)
- The 500 Word Essay (2007)
- Sweet Tooth (2007)
- Benchmates (2008)
- Arterial Deposition in Thought and Being (2008)
- Dependencia (2008)
- Takhsees [Dedication] (2009)
- Khanuadeh (2009)
- 1993 (2009)
- 1993 Part Two (2009)
- Reverie (2009)
- Psalm 51 (2010)

== See also ==
- Experimental film
- Sacred music
