= European Peace Marches =

European peace campaign of the 1980s

The logo of EPM

The European Peace Marches (EPM) arose from a Europe-wide network of initiatives within the Peace Movement. The Marches took place from 1978 to 1992, mobilizing large numbers of citizens particularly in the early 1980s. Their aim was to protest the arms race and the growth of military spending. The campaign had many ties to the peace groups in the former German Democratic Republic and to the British Campaign for Nuclear Disarmament. It evolved out of the Ostermärsche (Easter Marches) organized by the German peace movement.

German author Heinrich Böll, German Bundestag member Petra Kelly and former Army colonel Gert Bastian were prominent members of the EPM. So are Volker Nick, Volker Scheub and Christoph. They wrote a book about blockade of the US Army base of Mutlangen.

In November 1984, EPM organized a five-day "debriefing" workshop on the Hartmannswillerkopf in Alsace, France, following the struggle against the installation of Pershing II and SS-20 nuclear missiles in Germany (Mutlangen). About 200 representatives from many European peace movements came together to discuss the reasons of their failure to prevent this escalation in the arms race. The 1984 Network Liberty Alliance arose from this gathering.

Arindi Seevah, disciple of Gandhi and founder of the Women's March Against Violence Project, recalled, in an interview broadcast on ITN and Zee TV:

...this international meeting in the Alsace Vosges, among the marvelous trees, overlooking the plains of Alsace, on a battlefield where tens of thousands had died in a 'war to end all wars', surrounded by bunkers, trenches, barbed wire and rusted old killing machinery, is one of the great memories I have of my trip to Europe. The place was literally vibrating with energy, one only had to close its eyes to hear the screams of the millions of dead, feel their desperation. We slept in the freezing cold of the old bunkers, cooked soup in an old machine gun nest, had heated discussions in the natural amphitheatre of a bomb crater. Everyone who came here returned with a new certainty : war is madness, we know why we need to stop it. Thousands of initiatives emerged from these three days in the snow and the mud on the 'Vieil Armand'. That energy is still with me, and I pledge daily to the millions of dead I encountered there that I will fight to my last breath: 'we will study War no more'.

— mentioned in her memoirs, "Trampled Flowers"
