= Brandon Nozaki Miller =

American motorcycle racer

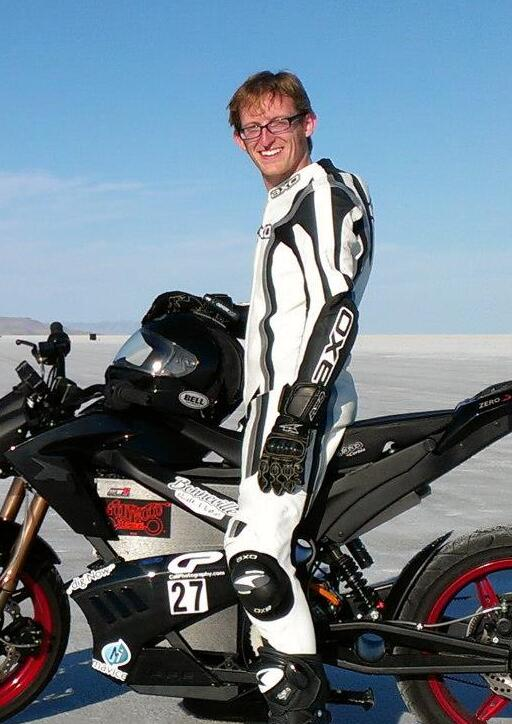
Brandon Nozaki Miller in 2012

Brandon Nozaki Miller, also known by the user name RIAEvangelist, is an American software developer and motorcyclist.

== Motorcycle career ==
Miller is a pioneer in high-speed electric motorcycling. He began his riding career exclusively on electric motorcycles, and transitioned to competitive racing. Miller was the first person to "break the ton" (go over 100 mph) in the 150 kg Unfaired Electric Motorcycle Class. As of 2012, he holds the FIM/AMA landspeed records for 150 kg unfaired electric motorcycle in the mile, 101.652 mph, and the kilometer, 102.281 mph. He first set these records using a stock 2012 production Zero Motorcycles ZF6, breaking the previous record of 68 mph a speed of 96 mph for two FIM/AMA world records and setting a new AMA record for fastest modified production electric motorcycle, all of which he broke two more times in the following two days resulting in his final records over 100 mph. Miller set his records at the Bonneville Speedway in Utah. Miller set his records two years after he began riding.

== March 2022 node-ipc malware incident ==
In March 2022, Miller, maintainer of the node-ipc package on the npm package registry, released a version in protest of the Russian invasion of Ukraine allegedly containing malicious code. The payload would write a file named "WITH-LOVE-FROM-AMERICA.txt", containing an anti-war message, to the desktop of affected machines. Additionally, on machines with Belarusian and Russian IP addresses, the payload would overwrite all files on the system with a heart emoji. Miller denied the allegations that the code was malicious, and said he had been swatted in retaliation; however, sources reporting on this disputed his denials.
