= Guerrilla Mail =

Free disposable email address service

Guerrilla Mail is a free disposable email address service launched in 2006. Visitors are automatically assigned a random email address upon visiting the site.

== Features ==
Guerrilla Mail randomly generates disposable email addresses. Disposable email addresses may be used as a means of spam prevention. They may also be used if the user does not wish to give a real email, for example if they fear a data breach. Emails sent to addresses are kept for one hour before deletion. The site offers some choice of email domain names.

== History ==
Guerrilla Mail was founded in 2006 in Chicago.

Privacy-centered services saw an up-tick in public interest after the global surveillance disclosures beginning in 2013, especially concerning attention brought to materials leaked by Edward Snowden. According to The Mercury News in 2014, "[Guerrilla Mail] has done nearly half of its business in the past year".

As of 4 November 2020, Guerrilla Mail stated on Twitter that their site had been taken down by their hosting provider, OVHcloud, due to a law enforcement request which OVHcloud refused to provide details about. This prompted criticism over infringement upon freedom of speech.

However, as of 20 August 2023, sending email from Guerrilla Mail had once again been suspended. On an X social media post on the same date, Guerrilla Mail announced "We're back online! However, the sending of outgoing emails has been suspended until further notice."
