= UXu =

Underground eXperts United
- Formation: 1991–1992
- Dissolved: 2002
- Purpose: Underground ezine
- Members: Phearless; The GNN; Ralph 124C41+ Bravemoore; Joseph; Hedge; Eric Chaet; Ikonoklast; Leon Felkins... and many more
- Origin: Sweden
- Founders: The Chief

uXu, or Underground eXperts United was an underground ezine active from 1991 to 2002. It was founded in 1991 by ex-members of the Swedish Hackers Association and was based in Sweden. The group was influenced by a similar movement in the United States known as Cult of the Dead Cow, or CDC.

The group has written and published 617 articles in English and more than 100 in Swedish. The first published articles, which were written in ASCII text, included descriptions of bombs, technology, and the computer scene in Sweden. These themes soon expanded over the years to include journal entries, philosophy, song lyrics, and interviews.
