= Peacenotwar =

2022 malware by Brandon Nozaki Miller

peacenotwar

Malware details
- Type: Protestware
- Subtype: JavaScript payload
- Author: Brandon Nozaki Miller

Technical details
- Written in: JavaScript

peacenotwar is a piece of malware, which has been characterized as protestware, created by Brandon Nozaki Miller. In March 2022, it was added as a dependency in an update for node-ipc, a common JavaScript dependency.

== Background ==
Between 7 March and 8 March 2022, Brandon Nozaki Miller, the maintainer of the node-ipc package on the npm package registry, released two updates allegedly containing malicious code targeting systems in Russia and Belarus (CVE-2022-23812). This code recursively overwrites all files on the user's system drive with heart emojis. A week later, Miller added the peacenotwar module as a dependency to node-ipc. The function of peacenotwar was to create a text file titled WITH-LOVE-FROM-AMERICA.txt on the desktop of affected machines, containing a message in protest of the Russo-Ukrainian War; it also imports a dependency on a package (npm colors package) that would create a denial-of-service attack for any server using it.

== Impact ==
Because node-ipc was a common software dependency, it compromised several other projects which relied upon it.

Among the affected projects was Vue.js, which required node-ipc as a dependency but didn't specify a version. Some users of Vue.js were affected if the dependency was fetched from specific packages. Unity Hub 3.1 was also affected, but a patch was issued on the same day as the release.

== See also ==
- npm left-pad incident
- Supply chain attack
- Hacktivism
- Reactions to the 2022 Russian invasion of Ukraine
- Anti-Russian sentiment
