= NBName =

Computer malware

NBName (note capitalization) is a computer program that can be used to carry out denial-of-service attacks that can disable NetBIOS services on Windows machines. It was written by Sir Dystic of CULT OF THE DEAD COW (cDc) and released July 29, 2000 at the DEF CON 8 convention in Las Vegas.

The program decodes and provides the user with all NetBIOS name packets it receives on UDP port 137. Its many command line options can effectively disable a NetBIOS network and prevent computers from rejoining it. According to Sir Dystic, "NBName can disable entire LANs and prevent machines from rejoining them...nodes on a NetBIOS network infected by the tool will think that their names already are being used by other machines. 'It should be impossible for everyone to figure out what is going on,' he added."
