= Sir Dystic =

Computer hacker

Josh Buchbinder
- Born: Josh Buchbinder
- Other name: Sir Dystic
- Occupations: Hacker, software developer
- Years active: 1997–present
- Organization: Cult of the Dead Cow (since 1997)
- Known for: Author of Back Orifice, SMBRelay, and NBName; member of Cult of the Dead Cow
- Notable work: Back Orifice, SMBRelay, NBName

Josh Buchbinder, better known as Sir Dystic, has been a member of Cult of the Dead Cow (cDc) since May 1997, and is the author of Back Orifice. He has also written several other hacker tools, including SMBRelay, NetE, and NBName. Sir Dystic has appeared at multiple hacker conventions, both as a member of panels and speaking on his own. He has also been interviewed on several television and radio programs and in an award-winning short film about hacker culture in general and cDc in particular.

Dystic's pseudonym is taken from a somewhat obscure 1930s bondage comic character named "Sir Dystic D'Arcy." According to the cDc's Sir Dystic, his namesake "tried to do evil things but always bungles it and ends up doing good inadvertently."

== Software ==
=== Back Orifice ===
Back Orifice (often shortened to BO) is a controversial computer program designed for remote system administration. It enables a user to control a computer running the Microsoft Windows operating system from a remote location. The name is a pun on Microsoft BackOffice Server software. The program debuted at DEF CON 6 on August 1, 1998. It was the brainchild of Sir Dystic, a member of the U.S. hacker organization Cult of the Dead Cow. According to the group, its purpose was to demonstrate the lack of security in Microsoft's operating system Windows 98.

According to Sir Dystic, "BO was supposed to be a statement about the fact that people feel secure and safe, although there are wide, gaping holes in both the operating system they're using and the means of defense they're using against hostile code. I mean, that was my message and BO2K really has a different message." Vnunet.com reported Sir Dystic's claim that this message was privately commended by employees of Microsoft.

=== SMBRelay & SMBRelay2 ===
SMBRelay and SMBRelay2 are computer programs that can be used to carry out SMB man in the middle (mitm) attacks on Windows machines. They were written by Sir Dystic and released 21 March 2001 at the @lantacon convention in Atlanta, Georgia.

=== NBName ===
NBName is a computer program that can be used to carry out denial-of-service attacks that can disable NetBIOS services on Windows machines. It was written by Sir Dystic and released 29 July 2000 at the DEF CON 8 convention in Las Vegas. Sir Dystic reported the issue that NBName exploits to Microsoft; he was acknowledged in a security bulletin.
