= Sacrament of Transition =

New religious movement based in Slovenia

- Sakrament Prehoda
- Formation: 1999 (officially registered)
- Founder: Marko Resinovic
- Type: New religious movement
- Headquarters: Slovenia
- Key people: Patrick K. Kroupa (high priest); Dana Beal (North American Apostolic Delegate)
- Affiliations: Students for Sensible Drug Policy; Million Marijuana March

Sacrament of Transition is a new religious movement based in Slovenia, based on and promoting the sacramental use of the psychoactive plant Tabernanthe iboga and its psychoactive chemical constituent ibogaine. The founder of Sacrament of Transition is Marko Resinovic. The organization routinely sponsors psychedelic-related conferences and meetings. It was officially registered in 1999.

Sacrament of Transition has representatives from activist organizations such as the Students for Sensible Drug Policy and Million Marijuana March. Other affiliates include Patrick K. Kroupa, whom the group has made a high priest, and Dana Beal, founder of Cures Not Wars, the North American Apostolic Delegate. Discussing addiction and his ibogaine use at the Chapel of Sacred Mirrors in early 2006, Kroupa said that while psychedelics such as LSD might allow a user to become aware of the damage his addiction was doing, "The flesh doesn't let you forget... But with ibogaine, the Light comes back down with you." The Sacrament of Transition actively proselytizes to heroin addicts with the message that ibogaine can help them. Besides the use of ibogaine as a sacrament, the Sacrament of Transition remains a heterodox body, with no other disclosed dogmas. Beal has maintained that Jesus consumed a mixture of ibogaine, Syrian rue, and cannabis during the Last Supper and the Passion.
