= Deadbeef =

Deadbeef may refer to:

- 0xDEADBEEF, a hexadecimal number used in various software operating systems as a magic number
- DeaDBeeF, an audio player program
