= Rob O'Hara =

American author (born 1973)

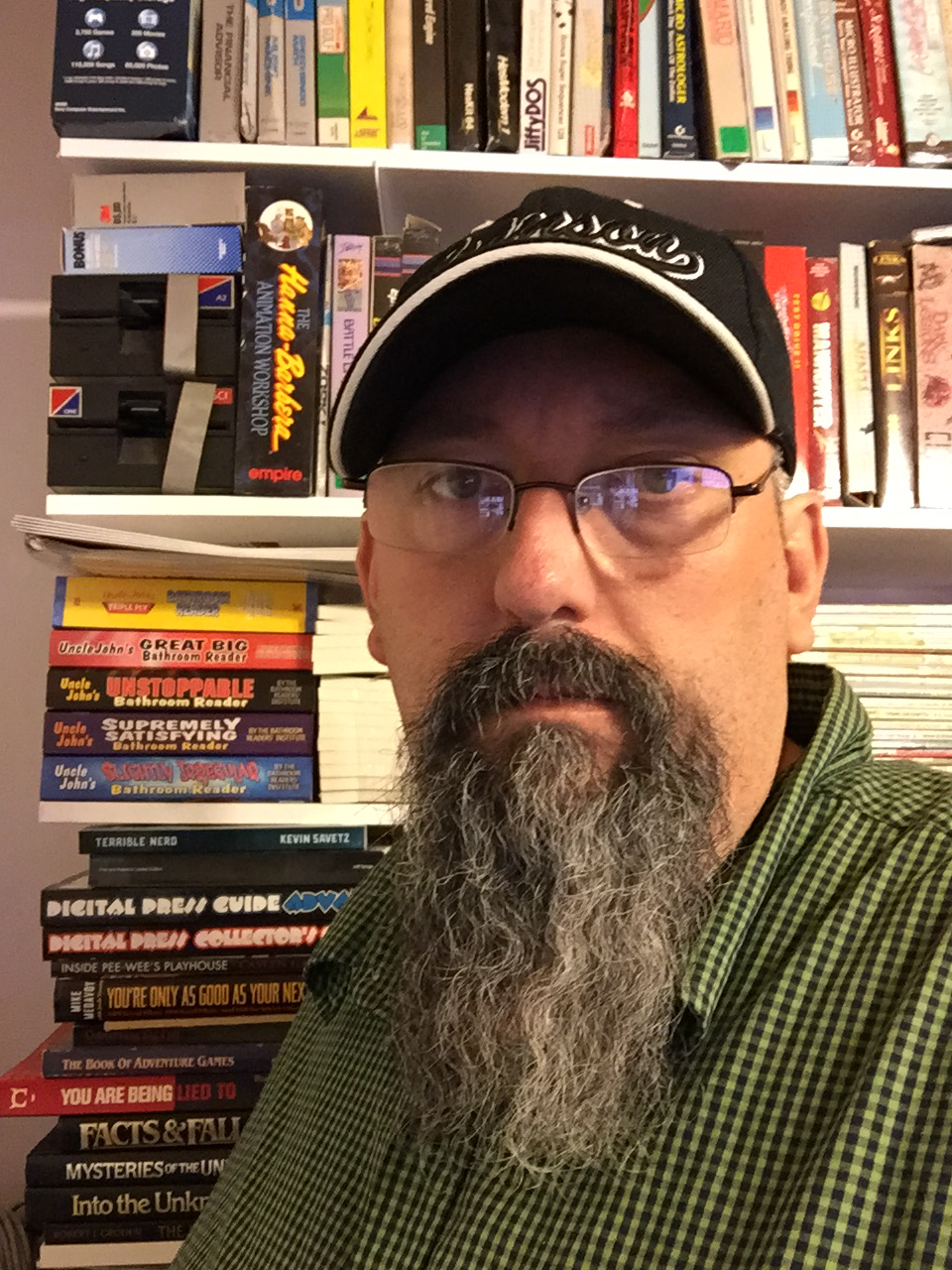
- Born: August 22, 1973 (age 53); Oklahoma City, Oklahoma, United States
- Occupations: Author, blogger, podcaster
- Years active: 1991–present
- Website: robohara.com

Rob O'Hara (born August 22, 1973) is an American author, blogger, and podcaster.

== Books ==
In 2006, O'Hara published Commodork: Sordid Tales from a BBS Junkie. Jason Scott, director of the BBS Documentary, dubbed Commodork "the world's first BBS memoir," stating the book "does what my film couldn't; go front to end on one boy's story to turning into a man online. And for that, I thank him, and I think a lot of others will too." Brett Weiss, author of the popular Classic Home Video Games book series, says he "recommends the book without reservation. Initially I wasn't sure what to expect, but it's obvious that (O'Hara) is a writer and a gamer, not just a gamer who happens to write. His style is clear and unpretentious, and the hilarious anecdotes alone are worth the price of admission."

O'Hara's second book, Invading Spaces: A Beginner's Guide to Collecting Arcade Games, is a beginner's introduction to the arcade collecting hobby. Earl Green from The Log Book stated "Rob O'Hara knows a couple of things about collecting arcade machines. Invading Spaces is where he shares that obvious wealth of knowledge with coin-op newbies like myself." Antique Week called the book an "amusing and informative tome."

In 2018, O'Hara published his first feature length fiction novel, The Human Library. The story was O'Hara's graduate project for his Master of Professional Writing degree at the University of Oklahoma. The Human Library currently has a 4.5 star rating on Amazon.

== Published Articles, Essays, and Writing Positions ==
O'Hara began his career writing music, movie, and video game) reviews on websites such as Review to a Kill and Review-o-Matic.com. In 2000, O'Hara was paid to write several DVD reviews for IGN. O'Hara then expanded into writing and submitting fiction.

== Podcasts ==
O'Hara has hosted and currently hosts multiple podcasts. His first podcast, You Don't Know Flack, began in 2008 and currently has a 5-star rating on iTunes. In 2013, O'Hara co-founded the retro-themed podcast network Throwback Network with his Throwback Reviews co-host Sean Johnson. The network currently hosts more than two dozen retro-themed podcasts.

=== Current Podcasts ===
- You Don't Know Flack (Retro/Stories)
- Sprite Castle (Commodore 64)
- Cactus Flack's (Arcade)
- Multiple Sadness (Bad/B-Movies)
- Throwback Reviews (80s Movies)

=== Former Podcasts ===
- No Quarter Podcast (Arcade) (Episodes 126–136)
- Rusted Metal (Heavy Metal)

== Presentations ==
O'Hara is a subject matter expert on Commodore computers, vintage video and arcade games, and self-publishing, and has spoken at multiple conventions on these topics.

- Def Con (2007): Self-Publishing in the Underground
- Notacon (2009): The World of Free Book Publishing
- Oklahoma Electronic Gaming Expo (2009): Collecting Arcade Machines

== Software ==
O'Hara has written and released several freeware programs, including:

- GP32 Renamer: a Windows utility that converts long filenames to 8.3 filenames for the GamePark 32 handheld console.
- ShadowPrint: a Windows utility for getting text directory listings.
- Batch-O-Matic: a Windows utility for processing batch files with external variable lists.
- eCoder Ring: a Windows message encryption utility.
  - eCoder Ring included a coded message that users were challenged to crack. In 2008, O'Hara offered a cash reward of $100 to anyone who could crack the code. In the weeks following leaked information about the NSA's practices, eCoder Ring was downloaded an additional 3,000 times. The code remains unbroken. In her abstract titled A Summary of Hacking Organizations, Conferences, Publications, and Effects on Society, Alisha Cecil called eCoder Ring a "fun, friendly, easy to use program that allows two people to send secret messages to one another" that "is capable of producing nearly unbreakable ciphers."

== Personal life ==
O'Hara currently resides in Yukon, Oklahoma with his wife, two children, and collection of vintage electronics.

=== Work ===
During the day, he works for the Federal Aviation Administration, where he has worked as a "Helpdesk/Technical Support Analyst, Computer Specialist/LAN Administrator, Senior Network Engineer, IT Security Specialist, member of the IT Communication Department, and Domain Admin/Enterprise Administrator."

=== Education ===
O'Hara graduated from Yukon High School in 1991. At Redlands Community College, O'Hara served as the editor of the school's newspaper and yearbook from 1991 to 1993. O'Hara graduated from Oklahoma City Community College in 2001 with an AA in Journalism, and earned a BS in Organizational Leadership from Southern Nazarene University in 2005. Most recently, O'Hara graduated from the Master of Professional Writing Program at the University of Oklahoma.

=== Hobbies ===
O'Hara refers to himself as a "collector of collections," and is working on a book with the same title. O'Hara frequently blogs about his Star Wars collection. In an interview with Oxford Karma, O'Hara discussed his collection of 30 arcade cabinets located in his home arcade. O'Hara was interviewed by the Associated Press about his arcade collecting hobby.
