= Hacktivismo =

Hacktivist group

- Formation: 1999; 27 years ago
- Purpose: Hacktivism
- Location: United States
- Origin: Las Vegas, Nevada
- Founders: Oxblood Ruffin
- Products: Camera/Shy; The Six/Four System; HESSLA
- Affiliations: Cult of the Dead Cow; Ninja Strike Force
- Website: Main Site

Hacktivismo is an offshoot of Cult of the Dead Cow (cDc), whose beliefs include access to information as a basic human right. It was founded in 1999.

The group's beliefs are described fully in The Hacktivismo Declaration, which seeks to apply the Universal Declaration of Human Rights and the International Covenant on Civil and Political Rights to the Internet. Oxblood Ruffin, the director of Hacktivismo, has argued forcefully against definitions of hacktivism that include web defacements or denial-of-service attacks. Hacktivismo has also authored its own software license agreement, the Hacktivismo Enhanced-Source Software License Agreement (HESSLA). The HESSLA prohibits use or modification that would violate human rights or introduce features that spy on the user.

== The Hacktivismo Declaration ==
The group's beliefs are described fully in the "Hacktivismo Declaration" which is a list of "assertions of liberty in support of an uncensored internet" and seeks to apply the Universal Declaration of Human Rights and the International Covenant on Civil and Political Rights (ICCPR) to the Internet. The Declaration recalls the duty of member states to the ICCPR to protect the right to freedom of expression with regards to the internet and in this context what is called the "freedom of information". The Hacktivismo Declaration states:

- "...such member states continue to willfully suppress wide-ranging access to lawfully published information on the Internet, despite the clear language of the ICCPR that freedom of expression exists in all media,"
- "...that transnational corporations continue to sell information technologies to the world's most repressive regimes knowing full well that they will be used to track and control an already harried citizenry,"
- "...that the Internet is fast becoming a method of repression rather than an instrument of liberation,"
- "...that in some countries it is a crime to demand the right to access lawfully published information, and of other basic human rights,"
- "...that denying access to information could lead to spiritual, intellectual, and economic decline, the promotion of xenophobia and destabilization of international order."

The Hacktivismo Declaration recognizes "the importance to fight against human rights abuses with respect to reasonable access to information on the Internet" and calls upon the hacker community to "study ways and means of circumventing state sponsored censorship of the internet" and "implement technologies to challenge information rights violations". The Hacktivismo Declaration does however recognize that the right to freedom of expression is subject to limitations, stating "we recognized the right of governments to forbid the publication of properly categorized state secrets, child pornography, and matters related to personal privacy and privilege, among other accepted restrictions." However, the Hacktivismo Declaration states "but we oppose the use of state power to control access to the works of critics, intellectuals, artists, or religious figures."

== Projects ==
Hacktivismo logo

=== Camera/Shy ===
Camera/Shy was the first Hacktivismo project released. It debuted in 2002 at the H.O.P.E. 2k2 convention in New York City. Written by The Pull, Camera/Shy is a steganographic tool that scans for and delivers decrypted content directly from the World Wide Web. It is a stand-alone, Internet Explorer-based web browser. It interprets and displays hidden information stored in the junk bits in GIF files.

=== The Six/Four System ===
The Six/Four System was written by Mixter. The software is a censorship resistant network proxy. It works by using "trusted peers" to relay network connections over SSL encrypted links. As an example, the distribution includes a program which will act as a web proxy, but where all of the connections will be hidden until they reach the far end trusted peer.

Hacktivismo and the cDc further gained notoriety in 2003 when the Six/Four System became the first product of a hacker group to receive approval from the United States Department of Commerce for export of strong encryption.

=== ScatterChat ===
ScatterChat is an encrypted instant messaging client based on Gaim. It was written by J. Salvatore Testa II and released at the H.O.P.E. Number Six conference in New York City on July 22, 2006. The source code is available, licensed under the HESSLA. It provides encryption as well as integrated onion routing with Tor, and secure file transfers. Scatterchat's security features include immunity from replay attacks and limited resistance to traffic analysis. Various flaws in the software have been elaborated by researchers.

=== Torpark ===
XeroBank Browser (formerly known as Torpark) is a variant of the Portable Firefox web browser with Tor built into it. XeroBank is intended for use on portable media such as a USB flash drive but it can also be used on any hard disk drive. cDc/Hacktivismo co-released v.1.5.0.7 along with Steve Topletz on September 19, 2006.

== Members ==
- Oxblood Ruffin
- Mixter
- bronc buster
- The Pull
- MiB
- J. Salvatore Testa II
- diskrez
- Arrakis
- Bronc Buster
- Mr Happy
- Ca$h Money
- Peking Duck
- Shaolin Punk
- Pu$$y Galore
- Jules
