= Grandmaster Ratte' =

Cofounder of the hacker group Cult of the Dead Cow

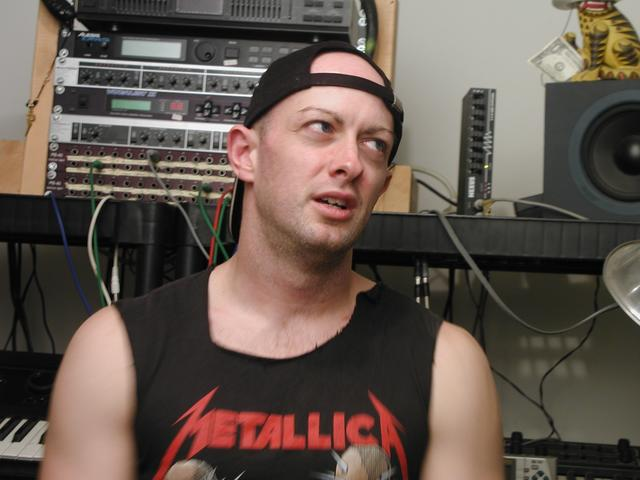
Grandmaster Ratte' as he appears in the 2005 film BBS: The Documentary

Grandmaster Ratte' (born Kevin Wheeler in April 1970 and formerly known as Swamp Rat and Swamp Ratte') is one of the founders of the Cult of the Dead Cow hacker group, along with Franken Gibe and Sid Vicious. His official title in the cDc was "Imperial Wizard of ExXxtasy".
