= XB Browser =

Web browser designed to run on both the Tor and XeroBank anonymity networks

xB Browser

- xB Browser 2.0.0.12b running on Windows XP
- Developers: Xero Networks AG & Steve Topletz
- Release: v.1.5.0.7, 19 September 2006
- Final release: v3.9.10.24 / 24 October 2009; 17 years ago
- Engine: Gecko
- Operating system: Windows
- Available in: 30
- Type: Web browser
- License: GPLv3
- Website: xerobank.com

xB Browser (formerly known as TorPark and Xerobank browser) is a web browser designed to run on both the Tor and XeroBank anonymity networks, and is available as component of the xB Machine and the xB Installer.

It is designed for use on portable media such as a USB flash drive, but it can also be used on any hard disk drive. As such, a secure and encrypted connection to any of the Tor or XeroBank routers can be created from any computer with a suitable Internet connection, and the browser clears all data that was created on the portable drive upon exit or on demand.

In 2007, TorPark was rebranded as xB Browser. At the time, it claimed 4 million downloads, increasing to over 6.5 million by February 2008.

== History ==
Steve Topletz co-released Torpark v.1.5.0.7 with CULT OF THE DEAD COW/Hacktivismo on 19 September 2006 after more than one year of development based on Portable Firefox web browser with built in support for Tor.

== Network usage ==
xB Browser routes Internet traffic through the Tor network, obscuring the originating IP address and encrypting the data.

xB Browser is optimized for use on the XeroBank anonymity network, which is a private and commercial broadband network operated by Xero Networks AG.

== Features ==
Besides the anonymous networks, xB Browser uses following add-ons:

- Adblock Plus,
- Cookies and Flash cookies removal,
- Browser history clearing after closing.
