= Oxblood Ruffin =

Canadian hacker

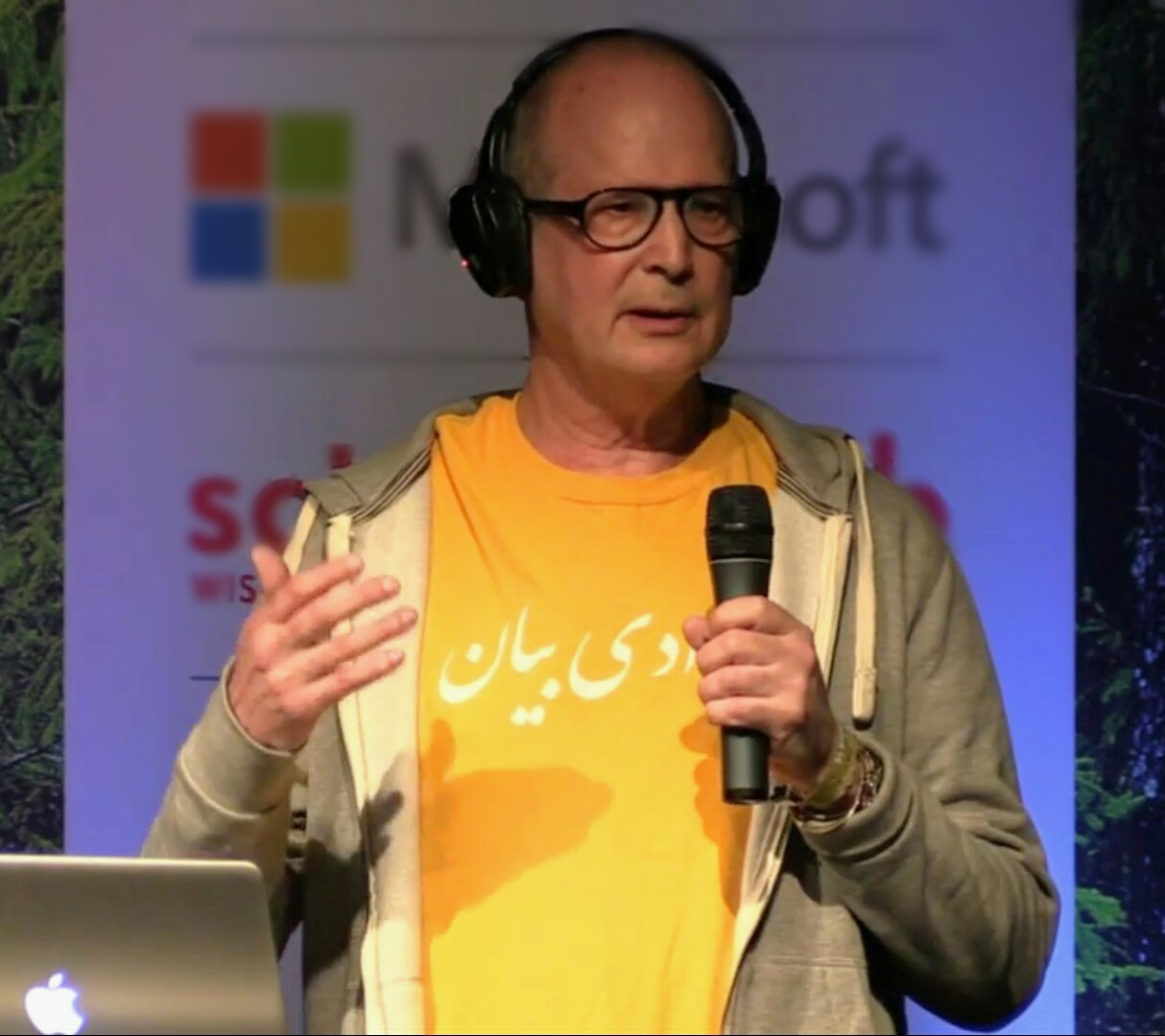
Oxblood Ruffin, 2014

Oxblood Ruffin is a Canadian hacker. He is a member of the hacker group Cult of the Dead Cow (cDc), for which he serves as "Foreign Minister." He is also the founder and executive director of Hacktivismo, an offshoot of cDc. Ruffin is active in human rights causes and is a vocal proponent of hacktivism, a term which he has helped to define. He has participated in both technology and human rights conferences, both on his own and along with cDc. He also has written articles for The Register and .net. Ruffin is also an infrequent contributor to both the cDc blog and the Hacktivismo News blog.
