= List of hackers =

This is a list of notable hackers who are known for their hacking acts.

== A ==
- Mark Abene (Phiber Optik)
- Ryan Ackroyd (Kayla)
- Mustafa Al-Bassam (Tflow)
- Mitch Altman
- Jacob Appelbaum (ioerror)
- Julian Assange (Mendax)
- Andrew Auernheimer (weev)

== B ==
- Loyd Blankenship (The Mentor)
- Erik Bloodaxe
- Jonathan Brossard
- Barrett Brown
- Max Butler
- Raúl Horacio Barragán (Yuyo)

== C ==
- Brad Carter (RBCP, Red box Chili Pepper)
- maia arson crimew
- Jean-Bernard Condat
- Sam Curry
- Cyber Anakin

== D ==
- Daniel Sentinelli (El Chacal)
- Kim Dotcom
- John Draper (Captain Crunch)
- Sir Dystic
- Wang Dong

== E ==
- Alexandra Elbakyan
- Mohamed Elnouby
- Empress
- Farid Essebar
- Nahshon Even-Chaim

== F ==
- Ankit Fadia
- Bruce Fancher (Dead Lord)
- Fernando Bonsembiante

== G ==
- Joe Grand (Kingpin)
- Richard Greenblatt
- Virgil Griffith (Romanpoet)
- Rop Gonggrijp
- Guccifer
- Guccifer 2.0

== H ==
- Jeremy Hammond
- Susan Headley (Susan Thunder)
- Markus Hess (hunter)
- George Hotz (geohot)
- Andrew Huang
- Marcus Hutchins
- Rim Jong Hyok

== J ==
- The Jester (hacktivist)
- Jonathan James
- Joybubbles (Joe Engressia, Highrise Joe)

== K ==
- Kyle Milliken
- Samy Kamkar
- Karl Koch (hagbard)
- Alan Kotok
- Jan Krissler
- Patrick K. Kroupa (Lord Digital)
- Kris Kaspersky

== L ==
- Adrian Lamo
- Chris Lamprecht (Minor Threat)
- Gordon Lyon (Fyodor)

== M ==
- MafiaBoy
- Moxie Marlinspike
- Morgan Marquis-Boire
- Gary Mckinnon (Solo)
- Jude Milhon (St. Jude)
- Kevin Mitnick (Condor)
- Mixter
- Hector Monsegur (Sabu)
- HD Moore
- Robert Tappan Morris (rtm)
- Dennis Moran (Coolio)
- Jeff Moss (Dark Tangent)
- Katie Moussouris
- Andy Müller-Maguhn
- MLT (Matthew Telfer)
- Behzad Mohammadzadeh

== N ==
- Craig Neidorf (Knight Lightning)

== O ==
- Beto O'Rourke (Psychedelic Warlord)
- Higinio Ochoa

== P ==
- Justin Tanner Petersen (Agent Steal)
- Kevin Poulsen (Dark Dante)

== R ==
- Eric S. Raymond (ESR)
- Christien Rioux (DilDog)
- Leonard Rose (Terminus)
- Oxblood Ruffin
- Joanna Rutkowska

== S ==
- Peter Samson
- David Schrooten (Fortezza)
- Roman Seleznev (Track2)
- Alisa Shevchenko
- Rich Skrenta
- Dmitry Sklyarov
- Edward Snowden
- Space Rogue
- Richard Stallman (rms)
- StankDawg
- Matt Suiche
- Peter Sunde
- Gottfrid Svartholm (Anakata)
- Kristina Svechinskaya
- Aaron Swartz

== T ==
- Ehud Tenenbaum
- Cris Thomas (Space Rogue)
- John Threat
- Topiary
- Tron (Boris Floricic)
- Justine Tunney

== V ==
- Kimberley Vanvaeck (Gigabyte)

== W ==
- Steve Wozniak
- Chris Wysopal (Weld Pond)
- Robert Willis

== Y ==
- YTCracker

== Z ==
- Peiter Zatko (Mudge)

== See also ==
- Tech Model Railroad Club
- List of computer criminals
- List of fictional hackers
- List of hacker groups
- List of hacker conferences
- Hackerspace
- Phreaking
