= Great Hacker War =

Purported conflict between computer hackers

The Great Hacker War was a purported conflict between the Masters of Deception (MOD), an unsanctioned splinter faction of the older hacker group Legion of Doom (LOD), and several smaller associated groups. Both primary groups involved made attempts to hack into the opposing group's networks, across the Internet, X.25, and telephone networks. In a panel debate of The Next HOPE conference in 2010, Phiber Optik re-iterated that the rumored "gang war in cyberspace" between Legion of Doom and Masters of Deception never happened, and that it was "a complete fabrication" by the U.S attorney's office and some sensationalist media. Furthermore, two other high-ranking members of the LOD confirmed that the "Great Hacker War" never occurred, reinforcing the idea that this was just a competition of one-upmanship and not a war.

== Timeline ==
The Great Hacker War escalated in the space of only a few days with four key events.

=== Event One ===
The Great Hacker War began with the closing of an invite-only bulletin board called "Fifth Amendment," whose participants were some of the world's most successful hackers.

Said board was run by members of the newly reformed LOD under the leadership of Chris Goggans (aka Erik Bloodaxe) and Loyd Blankenship (aka The Mentor).

The board's closing had been blamed on John Lee ("Corrupt") of the MOD in a cryptic message left to users. Chris Goggans (LOD) had claimed that Lee had been distributing information that was discussed on the board. MOD had discovered that Chris Goggans and his friends had decided to use the information being posted on the board to start a security company and contact all companies being discussed about the security flaws posted on Fifth Amendment.

=== Event Two ===
A few prank phone calls to the home number of the new LOD upset Goggans and prompted him to put out a call to find the personal information of the members of the MOD. Peacemakers intervened, and a conference call was arranged on an unnamed RBOC telephone bridge in the Midwest. As members of the MOD silently joined the conference call, they overheard the members of the LOD using racial slurs to describe the ethnicity of members of the MOD. The peace conference quickly degenerated into threats and prank calls to members of the LOD, whose personal information had already been uncovered by the MOD.

=== Event Three ===
A last-minute, late-night peace talk was held between Chris Goggans (LOD) and Mark Abene ("Phiber Optik") of MOD. Unknown to Goggans, John Lee ("Corrupt") was listening in on three-way. Goggans became angry that Abene would not fulfill his numerous demands for the personal information of MOD members, and for the MOD's hacking information that he considered the property of LOD.

Abene refused to meet Goggans's demands, and Goggans uttered his infamous phrase that began the war in earnest – "MOD is nothing but niggers, spics, and white trash." That night, prank phone calls began to flood Abene's house.

=== Event Four ===
The members of the MOD decided to eavesdrop on Chris Goggans's phone calls to determine his motives. Using the undocumented remote headset feature on a DMS-100 phone switch local to Goggans, the MOD overheard what they had suspected earlier. Goggans, Scott Chasin ("Doc Holiday"), and Jake Kenyon Shulman ("Malefactor") had decided to form a security company called ComSec.

=== Epilogue ===
In 1991, Phiber Optik, while attending the first CFP conference in San Francisco with Craig Neidorf, was invited to join a telephone conference bridge by fellow hackers where an apologetic Shulman expressed his remorse at how the situation had been blown out of proportion and his view that Goggans had crossed the line in informing on other hackers to law enforcement to increase the prestige of ComSec. Further, it was suspected by other LOD members that Goggans had baited Phoenix of the Australian hacker group The Realm, and was instrumental in providing evidence to Australian federal authorities. As a result, Phiber, a friend of Phoenix's, received a conference call from several original LOD members now suspicious of Goggans, wondering if they had been implicated by Goggans or other informants in Abene's pending legal case, in addition to expressing their general distaste and distrust of Goggans. In 1993 at the third CFP conference, also in San Francisco, Phiber/Abene met a small handful of his old LOD friends (minus Goggans) for the first time in person despite having been friends for nearly ten years by that point, and briefly reminisced about old times. Some years later in a public statement, Goggans would show some regret that he involved Abene in his testimonials to law enforcement. Perhaps the one thing in all this that Phiber and Lex Luthor agree on is that in reality, there simply was no "Great Hacker War", and that the notion of "warring hacker gangs" was an invention of overzealous law enforcement which was latched onto by irresponsible mass media because the imagery made for good copy.

== See also ==
- The Hacker Crackdown
- Nahshon Even-Chaim ("Phoenix")
