= John Perry Barlow =

American poet, essayist, and cattle rancher (1947–2018)

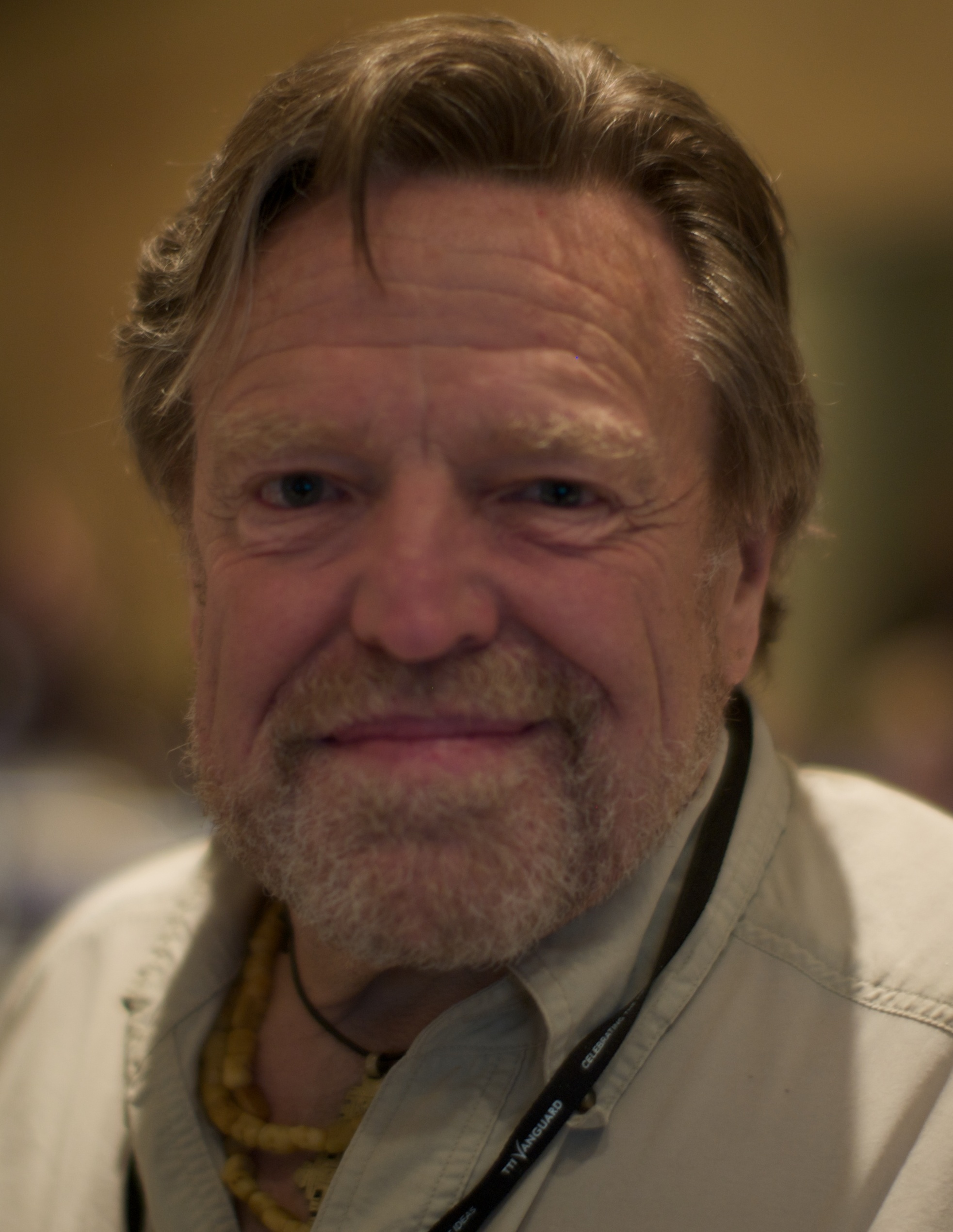
- Barlow in August 2012
- Born: October 3, 1947 near Cora, Wyoming, U.S.
- Died: February 7, 2018 (aged 70); San Francisco, California, U.S.
- Education: Wesleyan University
- Occupations: Lyricist; essayist
- Writing career
- Period: 1971–2000 (lyrics); 1990–2018 (essays)
- Subject: Internet (essays)

John Perry Barlow (October 3, 1947 – February 7, 2018) was an American poet, essayist, cattle rancher, and cyberlibertarian political activist. He was also a lyricist for the Grateful Dead, a founding member of the Electronic Frontier Foundation and the Freedom of the Press Foundation, and an early fellow at Harvard University's Berkman Klein Center for Internet & Society.

== Early life and education ==
Barlow was born in Sublette County, Wyoming near the town of Cora, the only child of Norman Walker Barlow, a Republican state legislator, and his wife, Miriam Adeline Barlow (née Jenkins, later Bailey), who married in 1929.

Barlow's paternal ancestors were Mormon pioneers. He grew up on Bar Cross Ranch in Cora, Wyoming, a 22,000-acre (8,900 ha) property his great-uncle founded in 1907, and attended elementary school in a one-room schoolhouse. He was raised as a devout member of The Church of Jesus Christ of Latter-day Saints and prohibited from watching television until the sixth grade, when his parents allowed him to "absorb televangelists".

Although Barlow's academic record was erratic throughout his secondary education, he "had his pick of top eastern universities... simply because he was from Wyoming, where few applications originated". In 1969, he graduated from Wesleyan University's College of Letters, where he joined the Alpha Delta Phi fraternity. He served as Wesleyan's student body president until the administration "tossed him into a sanitarium" following a drug-induced attempted suicide attack in Boston, Massachusetts. After two weeks of rehabilitation, he returned to his studies. In his senior year, he became a part-time resident of New York City's East Village and immersed himself in Andy Warhol's Factory, cultivating a friendship with Rene Ricard and developing a brief addiction to heroin.

As he neared graduation, Barlow was admitted to Harvard Law School. He was also contracted to write a novel by Farrar, Straus and Giroux at novelist and historian Paul Horgan's behest. Initially supported by an advance of either $5,000 or $1,000, he decided instead to spend two years traveling the world, including nine months in India, a winter stay on Long Island Sound in Connecticut, and a screenwriting foray in Los Angeles. Barlow eventually finished the novel, but it was rejected by several publishers (including Farrar, Straus and Giroux) and remains unpublished. During this period, he also "lived beside Needle Park on New York's Upper West Side and dealt cocaine in Spanish Harlem".

== Career ==
=== Grateful Dead ===
At age 15, Barlow became a student at the Fountain Valley School in Colorado Springs, Colorado. There he met Bob Weir, who later co-founded the Grateful Dead. Weir and Barlow maintained a close friendship through the years.

As a frequent visitor during college to Timothy Leary's facility in Millbrook, New York, Barlow was introduced to LSD; he later claimed to have consumed the substance over 1,000 times. These transformative experiences led him to distance himself from Mormonism. He went on to facilitate the first meeting between the Grateful Dead and the Leary organization (who recognized each other as kindred souls in spite of their differing philosophical approaches) in June 1967.

While on his way to California to reunite with the Grateful Dead in 1971, Barlow stopped at his family's ranch, not intending to stay. His father had suffered a debilitating stroke in 1966 before dying in 1972, resulting in a $700,000 business debt. Dismayed by the situation, Barlow changed his plans and began practicing animal husbandry under the auspices of the Bar Cross Land and Livestock Company in Cora, Wyoming, for almost two decades. To support the ranch, he continued to write and sell spec scripts. In the meantime, Barlow was still able to play an active role in the Grateful Dead while recruiting many unconventional part-time ranch hands from the mainstream as well as the counterculture. Prior to his death in 2018, John Byrne Cooke intended to produce a documentary film (provisionally titled The Bar Cross Ranch) that documented this era.

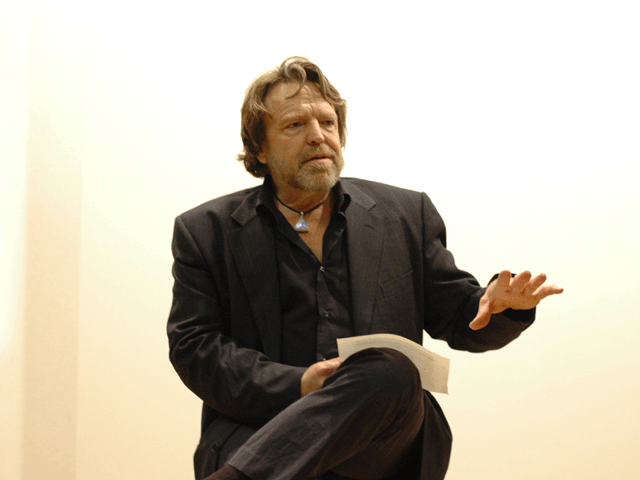
Barlow orating at the European Graduate School of Leuk, Switzerland in 2006

Barlow became interested in collaborating with Weir at a Grateful Dead show at the Capitol Theatre in Port Chester, New York, in February 1971. Until then, Weir had mostly worked with resident Dead lyricist Robert Hunter. Hunter preferred that those who sang his songs stick to his "canonical" lyrics rather than improvise additions or rearrange words. A feud erupted backstage over a couplet in "Sugar Magnolia" from the band's most recent release (most likely "She can dance a Cajun rhythm/Jump like a Willys in four-wheel drive"), culminating in a disgruntled Hunter summoning Barlow and telling him "take [Weir]—he's yours".

In late 1971, with a deal for a solo album in hand and only two songs completed, Weir and Barlow began to write together for the first time. They co-wrote songs such as "Cassidy", "Mexicali Blues" and "Black-Throated Wind", all three of which remained in the repertoires of the Grateful Dead and of Weir's varied solo projects. Barlow subsequently collaborated with Grateful Dead keyboardist Brent Mydland, a partnership that culminated in four songs on 1989's Built to Last. He also wrote one song ("The Devil I Know") with Mydland's successor, Vince Welnick.

=== Internet activism ===
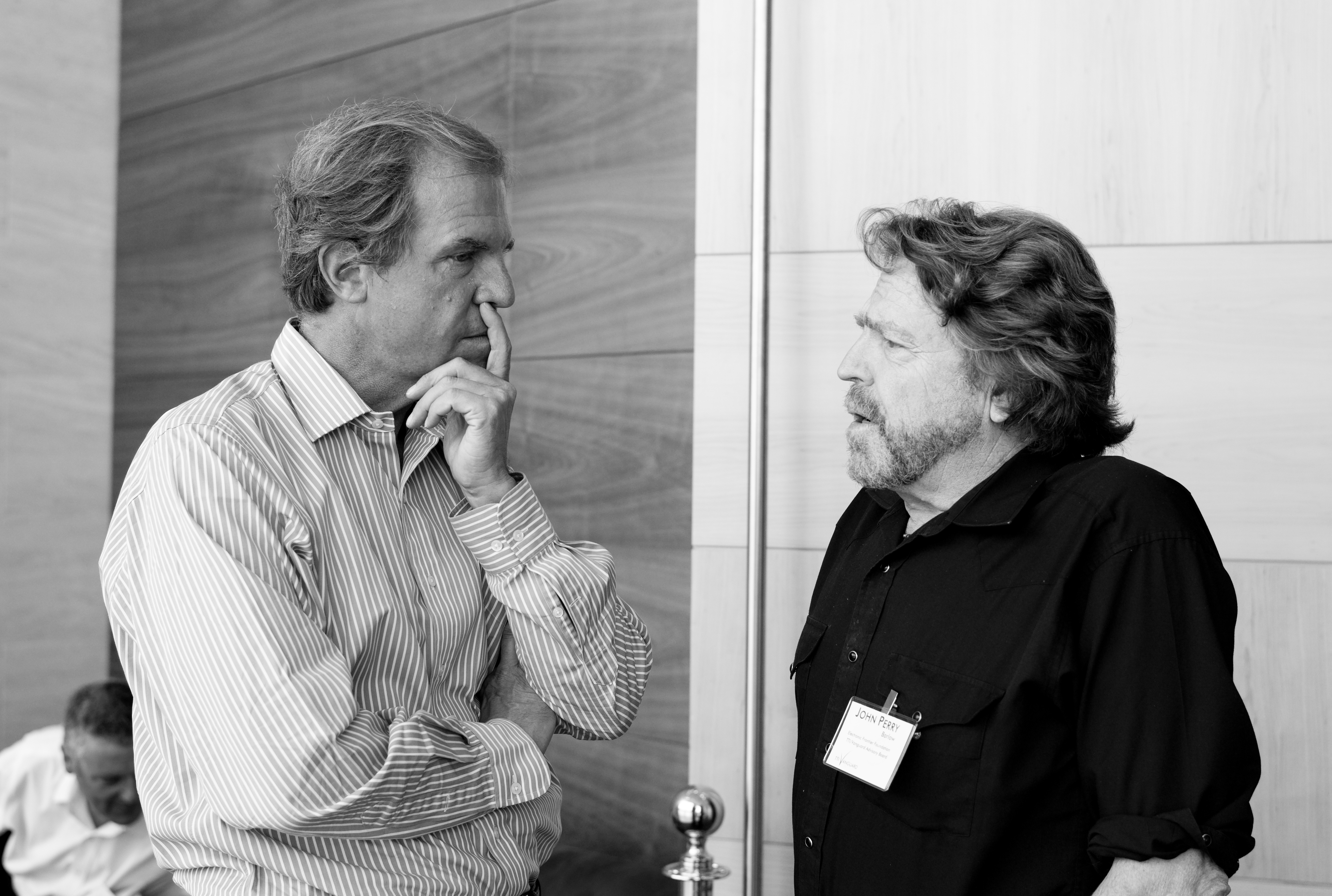
Barlow with Nicholas Negroponte

In 1986, Barlow joined The WELL, an online community then known for a strong Deadhead presence. He served on the company's board of directors for several years. In 1990, Barlow founded the Electronic Frontier Foundation (EFF) with fellow digital-rights activists John Gilmore and Mitch Kapor.

As a founder of EFF, Barlow helped publicize the Secret Service raid on Steve Jackson Games. His involvement is documented in The Hacker Crackdown: Law and Disorder on the Electronic Frontier (1992) by Bruce Sterling. EFF later sponsored the groundbreaking case Steve Jackson Games, Inc. v. United States Secret Service in support of Steve Jackson Games. Steve Jackson Games won the case in 1993.

In 1996, Barlow was invited to speak about his work in cyberspace to a middle school classroom at North Shore Country Day School. This event was highly influential upon the life of then-student Aaron Swartz: Swartz's father Robert recalls Aaron coming home that day a changed person. That year, Barlow also wrote "A Declaration of the Independence of Cyberspace", a widely disseminated creed for the Internet.

In 2003, Barlow met the recently appointed Brazilian Minister of Culture Gilberto Gil at the event Tactic Media Brazil to discuss the perspectives of digital inclusion and political participation, which in the following years helped shape Brazilian governmental policy on intellectual property and digital media. In 2004, the two began working together to expand the availability and variety of Brazilian music to remix and share online. At the same time, as one of the "digerati", Barlow was among the first users of the invitation-only social network Orkut at its inception. He decided to send all of his 100 invitations to friends in Brazil; two years later, some 11 million internet users in that country (out of 14 million total) were on the social network.

=== Writing ===
From 1971 to 1995, Barlow wrote lyrics for the Grateful Dead, mostly through his relationship with Weir. Barlow's songs include "Cassidy" (about Neal Cassady and Cassidy Law), "Estimated Prophet", "Black-Throated Wind", "Hell in a Bucket", "Mexicali Blues", "The Music Never Stopped" and "Throwing Stones".

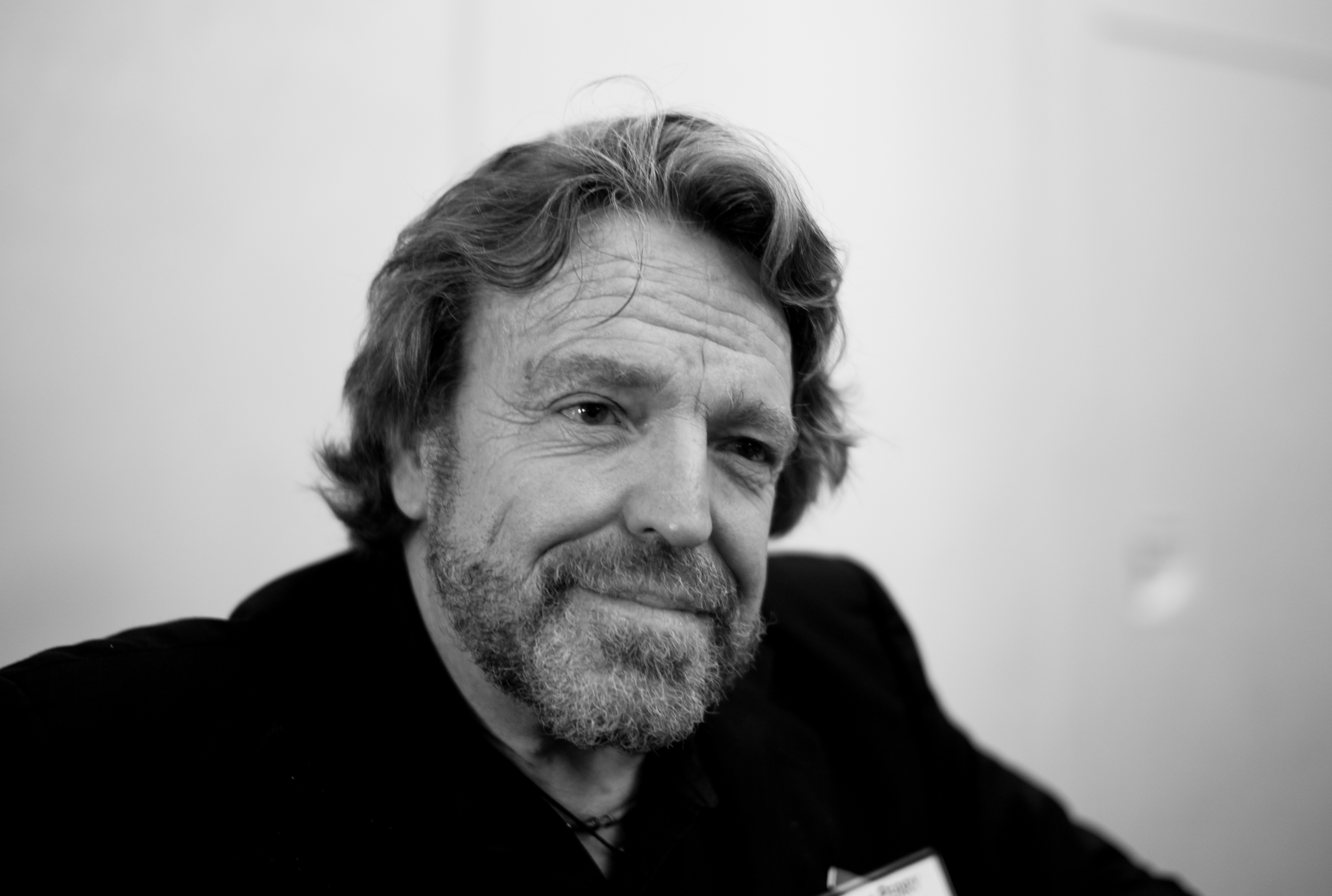
Portrait of Barlow, 2009

Barlow wrote extensively for Wired magazine, as well as The New York Times, Nerve, and Communications of the ACM. In his writings, he explained the wonder of the Internet. The Internet to him was more than a computer network; he called it an "electronic frontier". "He frequently wrote in language that echoed Henry Morton Stanley's African diary. 'Imagine discovering a continent so vast that it may have no end to its dimensions. Imagine a new world with more resources than all our future greed might exhaust, more opportunities than there will ever be entrepreneurs enough to exploit, and a peculiar kind of real estate that expands with development. Imagine a place where trespassers leave no footprints, where goods can be stolen infinite number of times and yet remain in the possession of their original owners, where business you never heard of can own the history of your personal affairs.'"

Barlow's writings include "A Declaration of the Independence of Cyberspace", written in response to the enactment of the Communications Decency Act in 1996. The EFF saw the law as a threat to the independence and sovereignty of cyberspace. He argued that the cyberspace legal order would reflect the ethical deliberation of the community instead of the coercive power that characterized real-space governance. Since online "identities have no bodies", they found it inappropriate to obtain order in the cyberspace by physical coercion. Instead, ethics, enlightened self-interest and the commonwealth were the elements they believed to create a civilization of the Mind in Cyberspace.

In his 1990 piece "Crime and Puzzlement: in advance of the law on the electronic frontier", Barlow wrote about his firsthand experience with Phiber Optik (Mark Abene) and Acid Phreak (Elias Ladopoulos) from the hacker group Masters of Deception, and mentioned Kevin Mitnick—all of whom were engaged in phone phreaking. The title alludes to Crime and Punishment by Fyodor Dostoevsky.

Barlow is credited with popularizing of the concept of pronoia (defined as the opposite of paranoia) and was considered a celebrity ally of the Zippy Pronoia Tour in 1994.

In 1998, Barlow wrote the article "Africa Rising: Everything You Know About Africa Is Wrong" for Wired, which documented the start of his extensive travels as he worked to expand Internet access across the continent: "I went from Mombasa to Tombouctou, experiencing various parts of Kenya, Ghana, the Ivory Coast, Mali, Uganda, and the Virunga volcano area where Uganda, Rwanda, and the Congo meet. Part of the idea was that I would attempt to email Wired a series of dispatches on my travels. The act of finding a port into cyberspace would be part of the adventure… Before I left, I believed Africans could proceed directly from the agricultural epoch into an information economy without having to submit to the dreary indignities and social pathologies of industrialization".

Barlow also returned to writing lyrics, most recently with The String Cheese Incident's mandolinist and vocalist Michael Kang, including their song "It Is What It Is". He was seen many times with Carolyn Garcia (whose monologue is dubbed on the eponymous track "Mountain Girl") at their concerts mixing with the fans and members in the band, and was a close friend of String Cheese Incident producer Jerry Harrison. He also participated with the Chicago-based jam band Mr. Blotto on their release Barlow Shanghai. Barlow was a spiritual mentor and student of Kemp Muhl and Sean Lennon, collaborating with their band The Ghost of a Saber Tooth Tiger and making a cameo in their 2014 music video "Animals".

One of Barlow's works that has remained in circulation is his "Principles of Adult Behavior", which he wrote in 1977 on the eve of his 30th birthday and continued to use to describe his approach to life. He described his reason for writing these as he was about to enter adulthood, "my wariness of the pursuit of happiness might be a subtle form of treason". While he considered most of the 25 statements similar to the platitudes Polonius dispensed to Prince Hamlet, the 15th attracted attention: "Avoid the pursuit of happiness. Seek to define your mission and pursue that". That was counter to prevailing thought and "un-American". Barlow saw this more as a way to challenge how one perceived their life, their job, and their goals in life, and to not see achieving happiness as "an obligation [one owes] to Jefferson, the United States, or God Itself".

=== Politics ===
Barlow was chairman of the Sublette County Republican Party, and served as western Wyoming campaign coordinator of Dick Cheney’s 1978 Congressional campaign.

Barlow was president of the Wyoming Outdoor Council from 1978 to 1984.

He was chairman of the Sublette County Master Plan Design Commission and served on the Sublette County Planning and Zoning Commission for many years; in that capacity, he was one of five ranchers who administered water distribution in the New Fork Irrigation District (an area of nearly 100,000 acres serving about 35 ranchers).

Despite having once lauded Cheney as "the smartest man I've ever met [with] the possible exception of Bill Gates", Barlow renounced Cheney before his vice presidency, owing to his perceived repudiation of environmental and civil-rights issues in Congress. Barlow opined that "Dick's votes… were parts of complex deals aimed at enhancing his own power… [H]e has the least interest in human beings of anyone I have ever met".

Barlow was named "One of the 25 Most Influential People in Financial Services" in the June 1999 issue of FutureBanker Magazine. By the early 2000s, Barlow was unable to reconcile his ardent libertarianism with the prevailing neoconservative movement, and "didn't feel tempted to vote for Bush". In 2004, he said that he was "voting for John Kerry, though with little enthusiasm".

Contemporaneously, he characterized cocaine derogatorily as a "Republican drug" that "makes its users self-obsessed, aggressive, and greedy". Barlow subsequently said that he remained a Republican, most notably during an appearance on The Colbert Report on March 26, 2007, and also claimed to be an anarchist.

Barlow said he voted for Natural Law Party Presidential candidate John Hagelin in 2000 after discovering in the voting booth that his friend Nat Goldhaber was Hagelin's running mate. He said in 2004: "I'm embarrassed for my country that in my entire voting life, there has never been a major-party candidate whom I felt I could vote for. All of my presidential votes, whether for George Wallace, Dick Gregory, or John Hagelin, have been protest votes". Barlow condemned Donald Trump in November 2016, characterizing him as a "thorough creep" and "toxic asshole" in a Facebook "micromanifesto".

=== Later work ===
Until his death, Barlow served on the EFF's board of directors, where he was listed as a co-founder after previously serving as vice chairman. The EFF was designed to mediate the "inevitable conflicts that have begun to occur on the border between Cyberspace and the physical world". It tried to build a legal wall separating and protecting the Internet from territorial government, especially the US government.

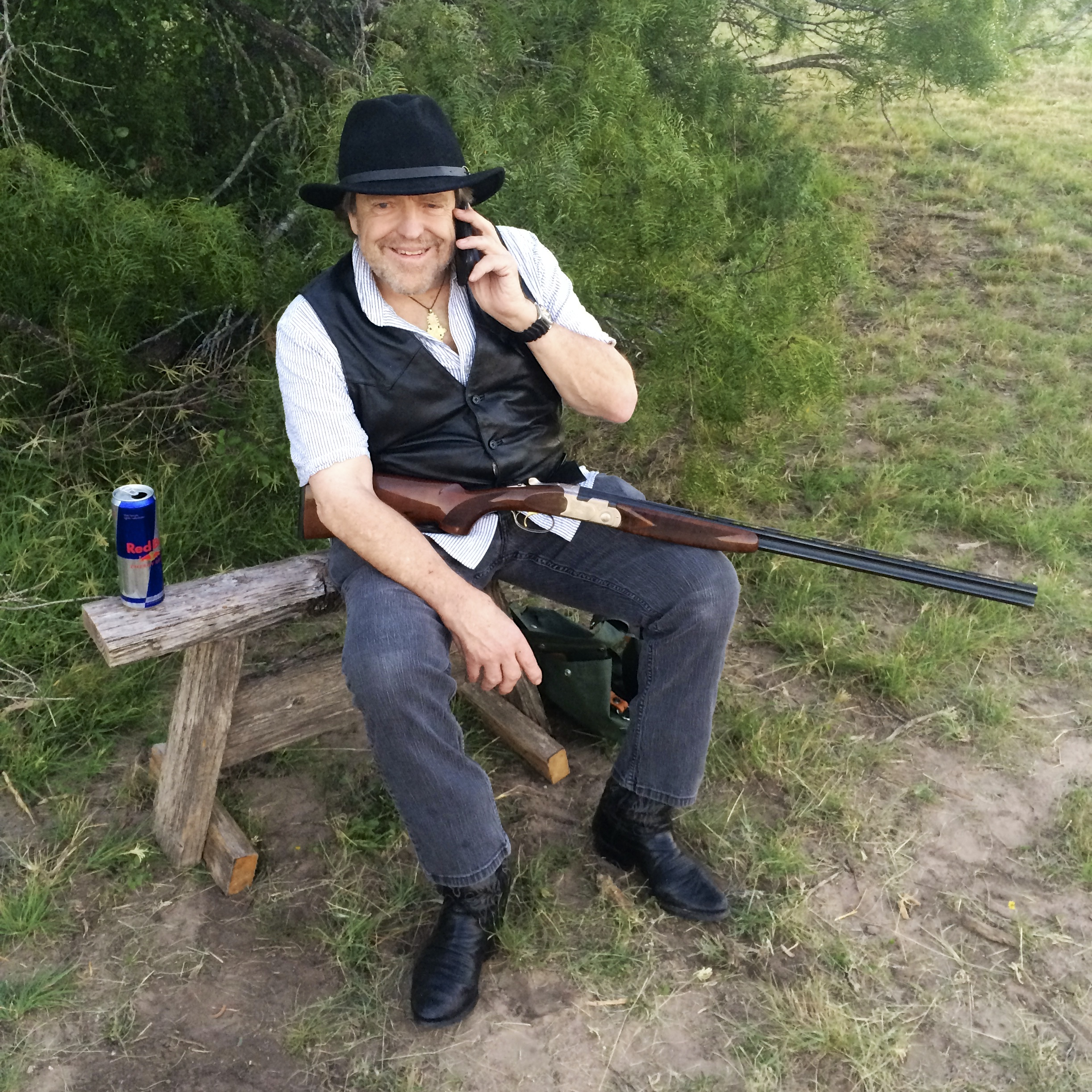
Barlow dove hunting with a shotgun near Corpus Christi, Texas in 2014

In 2012, Barlow was one of the founders of the EFF-related Freedom of the Press Foundation and also served on its board of directors until his death. He had several public conversations via video conference with fellow Freedom of the Press Foundation Board of Directors member Edward Snowden, and appeared in interviews with Julian Assange of WikiLeaks touting Snowden as a hero.

Barlow was a Fellow of the Berkman Center for Internet and Society at Harvard Law School (1997–2007; Fellow Emeritus thereafter); a member of the advisory board of Diamond Management & Technology Consultants (1994–2008); a member of the International Academy of Digital Arts and Sciences; and "professor of cyberspace" (2011) at the European Graduate School in Saas-Fee, Switzerland.

In his final years, Barlow spent much of his time on the road, lecturing about and consulting on civil rights, freedom of speech, the state of the internet and the EFF. He delivered lectures and panel discussions at TWiT Live, TedxHamburg, Hamburg (Germany), Greenfest SF, Civitas (Norwegian think tank), Internet Society (New York Chapter), the USC Center on Public Diplomacy, and the European Graduate School. On September 16, 2012, he was a presenter at TEDxSantaCruz, in Santa Cruz, California.

On September 8, 2014, Barlow was the first speaker in the Art, Activism, and Technology: The 50th Anniversary of the Free Speech Movement colloquium series at University of California, Berkeley.

Barlow also served on the advisory boards of the Marijuana Policy Project, Clear Path International, TTI/Vanguard, the Hypothes.is project, the stakeholder engagement nonprofit Future 500 and the global company Touch Light Media founded by Anita Ondine. He was a collaborator on the WetheData project founded by Juliette Powell.

He was Vice President at Algae Systems, a Nevada-based company with a working demo-scale pilot plant in Daphne, Alabama, dedicated to commercializing novel methods at the water-energy nexus for growing microalgae offshore as a second-generation biofuels feedstock and converting it to useful crude via hydrothermal liquefaction, while simultaneously treating wastewater, reducing carbon dioxide in Earth's atmosphere, and producing biochar.

At Startup Grind Jackson Hole on March 13, 2015, Barlow said that he was motivated to team up with Algae Systems after undergoing back surgery to address pain from an old ranching injury, while he had been an advisor to Herb Allison (president of Merrill Lynch at the time) and working to completely "electronify" financial transactions and speculative asset assembly. The surgery successfully alleviated the pain and catalyzed Barlow to change his focus from building wealth to building infrastructure in order to do something about the "amount of alterations we are already enacting on Planet Earth… We are not necessarily making it warmer, but weirder". At Startup Grind Jackson Hole, Barlow also explained how once over tea with "Grandmother of the Conservation Movement" Mardy Murie, he was inspired by her words, "Environmentalists can be a pain in the ass… But they make great ancestors". Adopting this philosophy, he stated, "I want to be a good ancestor".

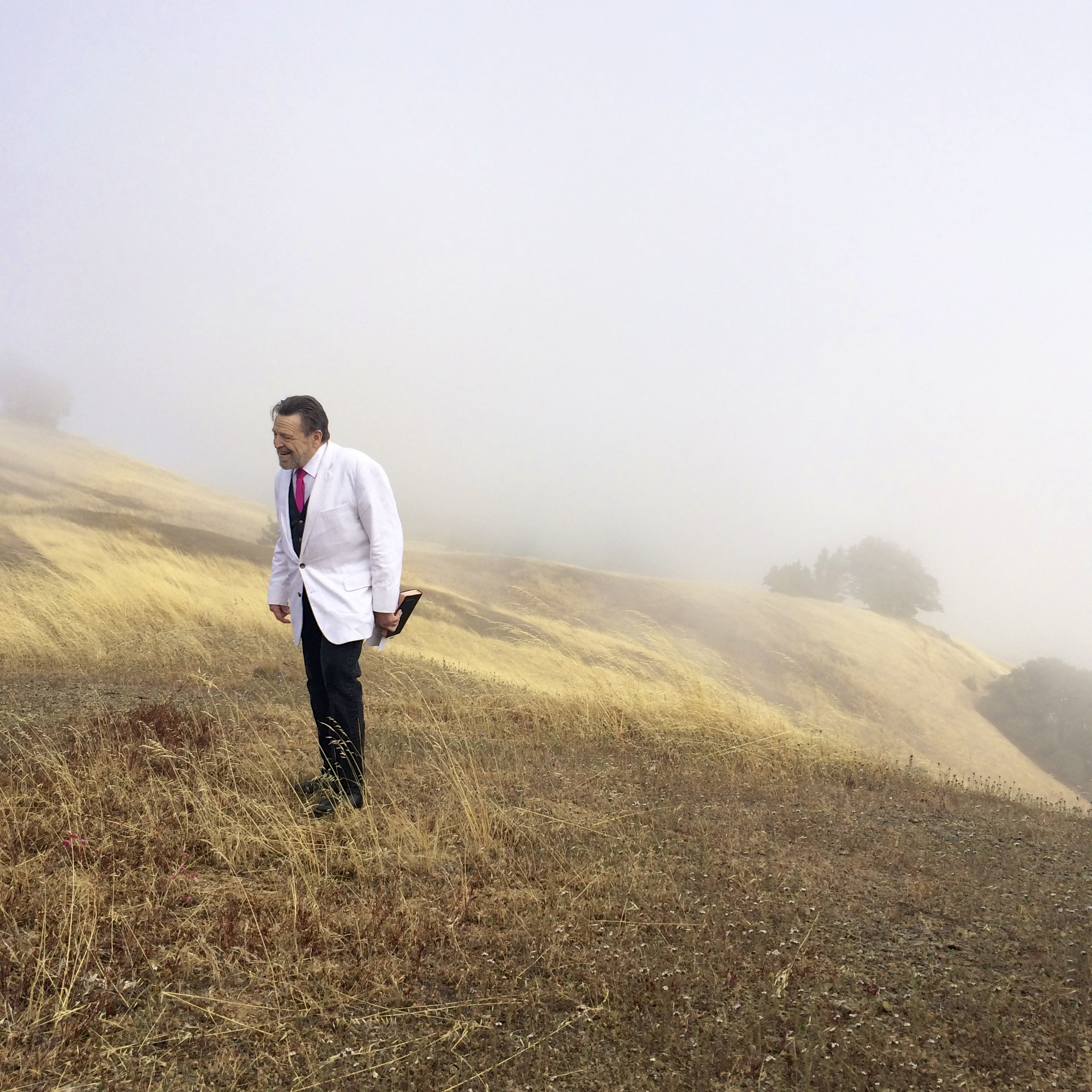
Barlow serving as wedding minister at Mount Tamalpais on July 11, 2014

For several years, Barlow attended Burning Man. In 2013, he led a town hall meeting with Burning Man co-founder Larry Harvey about "the current state [o]f Practical Anarchy at Burning Man".

A stir in the media transpired when retired U.S. Army general Wesley Clark attended Burning Man in 2013 and spent time with Barlow and Harvey.

Barlow appeared in many films and television shows, both as an actor and as himself. Interviews with Barlow have been featured in documentaries such as the Tao Ruspoli-directed film Monogamish (under production), Bits & Bytes (under production), and Dying to Know: Ram Dass & Timothy Leary.

The iPhone app Detour, released in February 2015 by Groupon founder and ex-CEO Andrew Mason, features a 75-minute audio tour narrated by Barlow as he walks through the Tenderloin neighborhood in downtown San Francisco.

Barlow was also a self-ordained minister who performed baptisms and weddings.

Barlow's memoir, Mother American Night: My Life in Crazy Times, was published posthumously in June 2018. Written with Robert Greenfield, it is a full-length recounting of his life and times. The book was completed days before Barlow's death in February of that year.

== Personal life ==
Barlow married Elaine Parker Barlow in 1977, and the couple had three daughters: Amelia Rose, Anna Winter, and Leah Justine. Elaine and John separated in 1992 and divorced in 1995. In 2002, he helped his friend Simone Banos (a realtor, entrepreneur, model and actress) deliver her daughter Emma Victoria, whom he regarded as his surrogate daughter thereafter.

Barlow was engaged to Cynthia Horner, a doctor he met in 1993 at the Moscone Center in San Francisco while she was attending a psychiatry conference and Barlow was participating in a Steve Jobs comedy roast at a convention for the NeXT Computer. She died unexpectedly in 1994 while asleep on a flight from Los Angeles to New York City, days before her 30th birthday, from a heart arrhythmia apparently caused by undetected viral myocarditis. Barlow describes this period in his life in the This American Life episode "Conventions", from August 29, 1997.

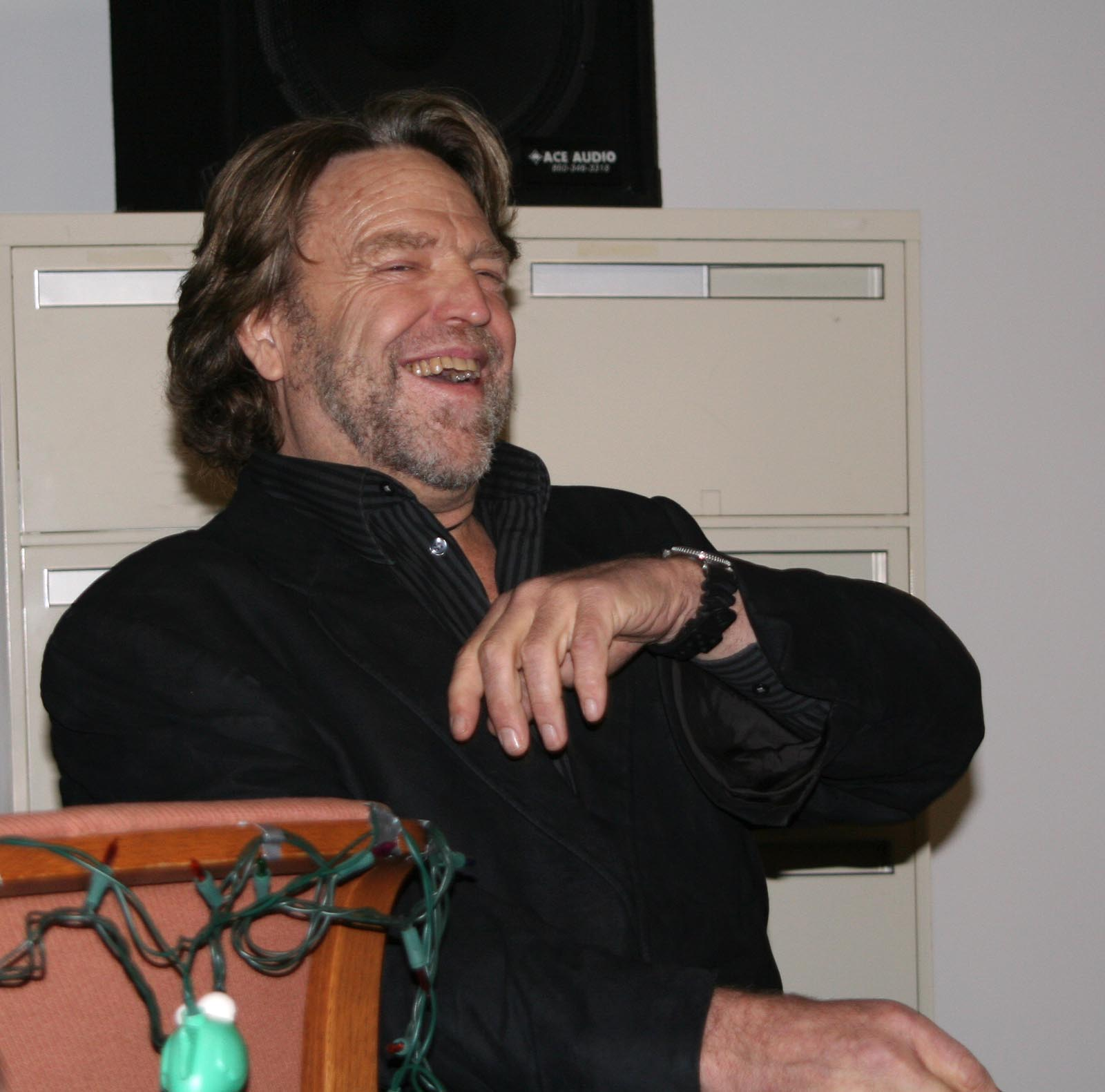
Barlow in 2005

Barlow had been a good friend and mentor to John F. Kennedy Jr., ever since his mother Jacqueline Kennedy Onassis had made arrangements for her troublesome son to be a wrangler at the Bar Cross Ranch for six months in 1978. The two men later went on many double dates in New York City with Cynthia and Kennedy's then-girlfriend Daryl Hannah.

In a piece for Nerve, "A Ladies Man and Shameless: A Polygamist's Manifesto", Barlow professed his love of many women at the same time, and summarized the relationships in his personal life: "I doubt I'll ever be monogamous again ... I want to know as many more women as time and their indulgence will permit me ... There are probably twenty-five or thirty women—I certainly don't count them—for whom I feel an abiding and deep emotional attachment. They're scattered all over the planet. They range in age from less than half to almost twice my own. Most of these relationships are not actively sexual. Some were at one time. More never will be. But most of them feel as if they could become so. I love the feel of that tension, the delicious gravity of possibilities".

Barlow was a friend and former roommate of the technology entrepreneur Sean Parker.

In 2014, Barlow suffered the loss of Buck, his beloved Maine Coon cat that he believed to be a bodhisattva; the cat had many fans on social media.

After a series of illnesses, Barlow suffered a near-fatal heart attack on May 27, 2015. He later reported that he was recovering. After a prolonged hospitalization, the John Perry Barlow Wellness Fund was established in October 2016 to allay outstanding medical bills and "provide the quality and consistency of care that is critical to Barlow's recovery as he faces a variety of debilitating health conditions", including "extremely compromised mobility". A concert held on October 11, 2016, to benefit the fund at Sweetwater Music Hall in Mill Valley, California, featured Weir, Ramblin' Jack Elliott, Jerry Harrison, Les Claypool, Robin Sylvester, Jeff Chimenti, Steve Kimock, Sean Lennon, Lukas Nelson, and members of The String Cheese Incident.

=== Death ===
Barlow died in his sleep on the night of February 7, 2018, at his San Francisco home, at the age of 70.

== Bibliography ==
- The Internet: A Historical Encyclopedia. Vol. 1: Biographies. ABC-CLIO. 2005. ISBN 1851096590.
- Goldsmith, Jack; Wu, Tim (February 24, 2006). Who Controls the Internet?: Illusions of a Borderless World. New York: Oxford University Press. ISBN 0195152662.
- Gray, Spalding (September 30, 2000). Morning, Noon and Night. US: Farrar, Straus and Giroux. ISBN 0374527210.
- Jones, Steve (December 10, 2002). Encyclopedia of New Media: An Essential Reference to Communication and Technology. Thousand Oaks, Calif.: SAGE Publications. ISBN 1452265283.
