= Elias Ladopoulos =

Technologist, businessman, and former hacker and phreaker

- Born: New York City, New York, U.S.
- Other name: Acid Phreak
- Occupations: Programmer, entrepreneur, investor
- Known for: Founding member of Masters of Deception (MOD), Hacking, Phreaking, computer security

Elias Ladopoulos is a technologist and investor from New York City. Under the pseudonym Acid Phreak, he was a founder of the Masters of Deception (MOD) hacker group along with Phiber Optik (Mark Abene) and Scorpion (Paul Stira). Referred to as The Gang That Ruled Cyberspace in a 1995 non-fiction book, MOD was at the forefront of exploiting telephone systems to hack into the private networks of major corporations. In his later career, Ladopoulos developed new techniques for electronic trading and computerized projections of stocks and shares performance, as well as working as a security consultant for the defense department. As of 2015, he is CEO of Supermassive Corp, which is a hacker-based incubation studio for technology start-ups.

== Founding of MOD ==
When Ladopoulos and Stira were engaged in exploring an unusual telephone system computer, Ladopoulos suggested seeking advice from Phiber Optik (Mark Abene), a well-known phreak who was also a member of the prestigious Legion of Doom (LOD) group. A productive phone hacking partnership developed, with the group later branding themselves Masters of Deception (MOD).

MOD's hacking exploits included taking control of every major phone system and global packet-switching network in the United States. Ladopoulos claims that he and another hacker were able to place a call to Queen Elizabeth II. Their pranks included taking over the printers of the Public Broadcasting Service (PBS), an incident that escalated when another hacker used the access they had established to wipe the PBS systems. The group is also known for retrieving phone and credit information for celebrities such as Julia Roberts and John Gotti.

=== Conflict with former Legion of Doom members ===
Abene's involvement in both LOD and MOD showed a natural alignment between the two groups in MOD's early years. As LOD's original membership broke up, however, conflicts arose between Abene and Eric Bloodaxe (Chris Goggans), another LOD member. Goggans declared that Abene had been expelled from LOD, resulting in a permanent split between the two groups. Ladopoulos is credited with writing "The History of MOD" for "other hackers to envy." Further disagreements and pranks, including the hacking of Goggans's security consultancy ComSec, have been characterized as the Great Hacker War.

=== Prosecution ===
On January 15, 1990 (Martin Luther King Day), the AT&T telephone network crashed. Later investigations revealed the cause to be a software bug; however, an FBI task force that had been investigating MOD was convinced the group was implicated. On January 24 the FBI raided the homes of five MOD members, including Ladopoulos, Abene, and Stira. Despite being released without charge due to lack of evidence, the MOD members were later re-arrested on a conspiracy charge following wire-tapping of future MOD members. After Abene rejected a plea bargain, Ladopoulos refused to testify against his fellow hacker, pleaded guilty and was sentenced to 6 months in a supervised camp facility, followed by 6 months' house arrest. According to U.S. attorney Otto Obermaier it was the "first investigative use of court-authorized wiretaps to obtain conversations and data transmissions of computer hackers" in the United States.

== Career ==
After completing his sentence, Ladopoulos was hired as a security engineer by the Reuters-owned electronic trading business Instinet. Hiring other former hackers, Ladopoulos built a department responsible for securing Instinet's global trading operations and developing security systems that were later acquired by NASDAQ. Later, as a consultant for Instinet, Ladopoulos also worked as VP Operations for the government security contractor NetSec (later Verizon Government).

In 2008, he founded Kinetic Global Markets with Roger Ehrenberg. As CEO and CIO, he led a team pioneering new approaches to systematic trading based on the computational analysis of terms used in SEC filings. Ladopoulos consulted on Ehrenberg's launch of IA Venture Capital.

In 2013, Ladopoulos founded Supermassive Corp., which describes itself as the original hacker incubation studio, "bringing together teams of extremely unique talents to rapidly prototype ideas that have a big impact."
