= Leonard Rose (hacker) =

American hacker (born 1959)

- Born: 1959 (age 66–67); Elkton, Maryland
- Other name: Terminus
- Convictions: Two counts of wire fraud, stemming from publishing an article in Phrack Magazine.
- Penalty: 12 month and 1 day prison sentence

Leonard Rose (born 1959 in Elkton, Maryland), a.k.a. Terminus, is an American hacker who in 1991 accepted a plea bargain that convicted him of two counts of wire fraud stemming from publishing an article in Phrack magazine.

He wrote an article for Phrack explaining how trojan horses worked and excerpted 21 lines of the AT&T SVR3.2 "login.c" source code. This prompted both AT&T and the United States Secret Service to raid his home and seize a moving truck full of computers, books, electronics and paperwork from his home office in Middletown, MD.

The two counts of wire fraud stemmed from him sending two pieces of email (the actual article containing excerpts of login.c to the publishers of Phrack on two occasions, as Craig Neidorf (a.k.a. Knight Lightning; then the co-publisher of Phrack) had accidentally deleted the original mail.

Other counts in the original indictment were from writing a brute force password decryption program using a dictionary attack, which the US Federal Government considered "burglary tools", and tried to approach much like a burglar carrying something to break into a physical residence during the commission of a crime.

During this period, Rose was also accused of being the "mastermind" of the Legion of Doom. Many newspaper articles referred to him as being somehow involved with the LoD, which was never the case.

John Gilmore, Mitch Kapor, John Perry Barlow and many others came to Rose's aid and helped pay for his defense. Mike Godwin was instrumental in coordinating his defense efforts until the capitulation and plea bargain.

The Electronic Frontier Foundation was founded on the cases of Terminus, Knight Lightning, Taran King, Steve Jackson Games and everyone else scooped up in Operation Sundevil, which was covered in Bruce Sterling's non-fiction book The Hacker Crackdown.

== See also ==
- List of convicted computer criminals
- Full disclosure (mailing list)
