= Women on the Web =

Women on the Web may refer to:

- San Francisco Women on the Web, a women's website
- wowOwow, a women's website founded as Women on the Web

== See also ==
- Women on Web, an online abortion help service
