= Gorgeous Geeks =

Interest group

The Gorgeous Geeks (GG) is an interest group based in Kuala Lumpur, Malaysia. Formed by women currently and previously from the IT industry, the Gorgeous Geeks seeks to encourage women to use technology as part of their lifestyles. The aim of the group is also to provide mentor or support for women in the industry as well as to inspire other women to join the industry.

The group were inspired by the Woman-In-Technology session on 12 Sep 2007, hosted by Microsoft. The Gorgeous Geeks was subsequently launched in January 2008 at Kuala Lumpur, Malaysia.

== See also ==
- Webgrrls
