= Cyber Anakin =

Pseudonymous computer hacker

- Occupation: Hacktivist
- Known for: Hacking and defacing systems
- Website: cyberanakinvader.wordpress.com

Cyber Anakin (also known by the handle cyberanakinvader) is the pseudonym of a computer hacktivist.

== Career ==
Cyber Anakin, who was then a teen, said that in 2016, in retaliation against Russia for the shooting-down of Malaysia Airlines Flight 17, he started targeting Russian websites and databases. The information gained from the news site and email provider km.ru and gaming company Nival Networks during the breaches included dates of birth, encrypted passwords, and geographic locations. There were 1.5 million victims. The content of the km.ru data breach was used to assist Latvian independent news website Meduza in establishing the identity of a man who had been sexually harassing female chess players by sending them letters containing used condoms and pages from pornographic magazines.

In April 2018, Cyber Anakin took advantage of an error in a North Korean propaganda website that erroneously linked to a non-existent Twitter account. As an "April Fools prank" he registered a spoof account under that unused username and posted numerous anti-DPRK propaganda messages including unflattering images and obscene slurs directed against Kim Jong-un.

In June 2018, Cyber Anakin took advantage of a security flaw present in internet connected set-top boxes, to temporarily deface a small number of television sets with messages in opposition to Article 13 of the European Union's Directive on Copyright in the Digital Single Market. In an interview with ZDNet, he expressed concerns that the proposed filter will "let things which shouldn't to pass through and block those that should be allowed".

Cyber Anakin said that he defaced the website of the Khuzestan Water and Power Authority following the shooting-down of Ukraine International Airlines Flight 752 in January 2020, placing the names of Flight 752's victims on its webpage.

== See also ==
- List of hackers
