= The Man Who Killed Hitler and Then the Bigfoot =

2018 American adventure drama film

- Theatrical release poster
- Directed by: Robert D. Krzykowski
- Written by: Robert D. Krzykowski
- Produced by: Robert D. Krzykowski; Patrick Ewald; Shaked Berenson; Lucky McKee; Louise Lovegrove
- Starring: Sam Elliott; Aidan Turner; Caitlin FitzGerald
- Cinematography: Alex Vendler
- Edited by: Zach Passero
- Music by: Joe Kraemer
- Production companies: Epic Pictures Releasing; Epic Pictures Group; Title Media
- Distributed by: Eagle Films; RLJE Films
- Release dates: July 20, 2018 (Fantasia); February 8, 2019 (United States)
- Country: United States
- Language: English
- Box office: $3,822

The Man Who Killed Hitler and Then the Bigfoot is a 2018 American adventure drama film written, co-produced and directed by Robert D. Krzykowski in his feature debut, and starring Sam Elliott, Aidan Turner, Larry Miller, Ron Livingston, and Caitlin FitzGerald.

The film debuted at the Fantasia Film Festival in Montreal, Quebec, where it premiered on July 20, 2018. The US premiere took place at the Plaza Classic Film Festival in El Paso, Texas on August 10, 2018. In the UK, it played at FrightFest London on August 26, 2018, in Spain at the Sitges Film Festival and in Finland at the Night Visions Film Festival.

== Plot ==
In 1987, Calvin Barr (Sam Elliott) is an old man living a quiet life with his dog. Barr maintains a peaceful routine, which includes frequenting a shabby bar and chatting with his brother, a barber, but experiences regular flashbacks to when he was a soldier in World War II. One night, a group of criminals attempt to mug Barr, stealing his car keys, wallet, and defacing the picture of a woman in Barr's wallet. Barr fights back, incapacitating all three.

In flashbacks, Barr is a young American soldier (Aidan Turner) entrusted with a top-secret mission to assassinate Adolf Hitler, which he completes successfully. In old age, however, Barr feels unfulfilled and bitter, because the Nazi leadership continued the war after the assassination with a convincing body double. The American government does not reveal the successful assassination, keeping all files classified. Over the course of the war, Barr's sweetheart Maxine writes him many letters, but during his brief leave, he stores them unread and the two drift apart.

In 1987, a pair of government agents, representing both America and Canada, approach Barr. They explain that a strange virus, originating from the legendary Bigfoot, is threatening all life on earth and is responsible for serial killings in the Canadian wilderness. Barr reveals in conversation that the several assassination attempts on Adolf Hitler were all successful, but ultimately pointless due to the number of the Third Reich's body doubles. Knowing Barr's reputation as a skilled tracker and survivalist, and that he is one of the few people immune to the virus, the agents try to recruit him to go into the wilderness and kill the Bigfoot in hopes it will end the epidemic. After initial resistance, Barr agrees.

Barr hunts the Bigfoot, wounding him with a gunshot. After tracking him through a swamp and up a mountain, Barr finds the Bigfoot dying. Moved by pity, Barr chooses to burn the body rather than turn it over to the government, but the Bigfoot is still alive and attacks Barr, breaking his arm and biting off an ear. The two fight until Barr shoots him to death. Barr lies back, seemingly dying from his wound.

The screen fades to Barr's funeral; Ed delivers the eulogy. Time passes and Ed goes fishing with Barr's dog. Secretly alive, Barr reappears and the two reunite. Having achieved a great success in stopping the potential epidemic, Barr finally feels fulfilled in life.

Barr later digs up his casket to retrieve an old, treasured box and walks home; the box's contents are never revealed.

== Cast ==
- Sam Elliott as Calvin Barr

- Aidan Turner as Young Calvin Barr

- Caitlin FitzGerald as Maxine
- Sean Bridgers as Mr. Gardner
- Ron Livingston as Flag Pin
- Ellar Coltrane as "The Clerk"
- Larry Miller as Ed
- Rizwan Manji as Maple Leaf
- Mark Steger as the Bigfoot
- Aubrey Hale as Rufus

== Production ==
Filming took place from August to September 2017 in Western Massachusetts, particularly Turners Falls.

John Sayles and Douglas Trumbull were the film's executive producers. Trumbull also provided special effects.

== Reception ==
=== Critical response ===
On review aggregator Rotten Tomatoes, the film holds an approval rating of 75%, based on 95 reviews with an average rating of 6.5/10. The website's critical consensus reads: "The Man Who Killed Hitler and Then the Bigfoot just about lives up to the wild promise of its title, due in no small part to Sam Elliott's world-weary work in the title role." On Metacritic, the film has a weighted average score of 51/100, based on 13 critics.
