= Dave Buchwald =

American filmmaker and hacker

- Born: September 4, 1970 (age 54)

Dave Buchwald (born September 4, 1970), is a filmmaker and former phone phreak, hacker, and leader of the Legion of Doom in the mid-1980s, then known as Bill From RNOC (/ˈɑːrnɒk/).

== Hacker ==
In the late 1980s, as a teenager, Buchwald was a social engineer, known for manipulating phone system employees anywhere in the United States into performing tasks that gave him access to systems. He used the handle Bill From RNOC with Arnock being short for the town IBM is based out of. He was also known for hacking Bell and AT&T systems (specifically COSMOS, SCCS, and LMOS), which allowed him virtually unrestricted access to phone lines, including the ability to monitor conversations, throughout the United States. He was the lead author of the popular PENIX suite of hacking tools. Many of his techniques are outdated but some of his original ideas are still in use by social engineers and security professionals today.

In 1995, Dave was introduced to film making when he served as a technical consultant to the movie Hackers, editing the screenplay and personally coaching many members of the principal cast.

== Security career ==
In 1997, Buchwald co-founded Crossbar Security with Mark Abene (a.k.a. Phiber Optik) and Andrew Brown. Crossbar provided information security services for a number of large corporations, but became a casualty of the dot-com bubble. Crossbar Security went defunct in 2002, largely due to cuts in corporate security spending and an increase in the cost of corporate computer security advertising.

== Arts career ==
Buchwald works as a film editor, freelance photographer, and graphic designer in New York City. He has been regularly producing cover art for 2600: The Hacker Quarterly since 2000 using the pseudonym Dabu Ch'wald. In August 2006, he completed his first feature film, Urchin. He has recently produced and edited the independent film Love Simple and is in pre-production on the film Kuru, the second movie by the production company The Enemy. A short he edited entitled Floating Sunflowers won the Gold Remi award for Best Comedy Short at the 47th Worldfest-Houston International Film and Video Festival in April 2014.

In August 2018, Dave and his collaborator, Michael Lee Nirenberg, presented sample scenes from a documentary series they are producing, Reverse Engineering at the DEF CON annual hacking conference in Las Vegas.

He currently resides in the Bay Ridge area of Brooklyn, New York.
