= The Hacker Crackdown =

Book by Bruce Sterling

The Hacker Crackdown: Law and Disorder on the Electronic Frontier
- First edition
- Author: Bruce Sterling
- Cover artist: Kirschner Caroff
- Language: English
- Genre: Electronic Crime
- Publisher: Bantam Books
- Publication date: November 1, 1992
- Publication place: United States
- Media type: Print
- Pages: 336
- ISBN: 0-553-56370-X
- OCLC: 30469826

The Hacker Crackdown: Law and Disorder on the Electronic Frontier is a work of nonfiction by Bruce Sterling first published in 1992.

The book discusses watershed events in the hacker subculture in the early 1990s. The most notable topic covered is Operation Sundevil and the events surrounding the 1987–1990 war on the Legion of Doom network: the raid on Steve Jackson Games, the trial of "Knight Lightning" (one of the original journalists of Phrack), and the subsequent formation of the Electronic Frontier Foundation. The book also profiles the likes of "Emmanuel Goldstein" (publisher of 2600: The Hacker Quarterly), the former assistant attorney general of Arizona Gail Thackeray, FLETC instructor Carlton Fitzpatrick, Mitch Kapor, and John Perry Barlow.

In 1994, Sterling released the book for the Internet with a new afterword.

== Critical reception ==
Cory Doctorow, who voiced an unabridged podcast of the book, said it "inspired me politically, artistically and socially".
