= Above the Below =

2026 film by Idris Elba and Martin Owen

- Theatrical release poster
- Directed by: Idris Elba; Martin Owen
- Screenplay by: Elizabeth Morris; Matt Mitchell; Vicki Sargent
- Story by: Martin Owen
- Produced by: Matt Williams; Gina Carter
- Starring: Idris Elba; Caitlin FitzGerald; Hero Fiennes Tiffin
- Cinematography: Mark Silk
- Edited by: Ben Mills
- Music by: Roger Goula
- Production company: Future Artists Entertainment
- Distributed by: Lionsgate
- Release date: December 4, 2026 (United States)
- Running time: 86 minutes
- Countries: United Kingdom; United States
- Language: English

Above the Below is an upcoming survival thriller film co-directed by Idris Elba and Martin Owen. Elizabeth Morris, Matt Mitchell, and Vicki Sargent wrote the screenplay from a story by Owen. Elba also stars in the film alongside Caitlin FitzGerald and Hero Fiennes Tiffin in a story about three astronauts trapped in their capsule as it sinks in the ocean.

== Premise ==
Three astronauts are returning to Earth when their vessel is forced off course during re-entry. They struggle to survive after being cut off from contact as their capsule sinks into the ocean.

== Cast ==
- Idris Elba as Jackson
- Caitlin FitzGerald as Brooks
- Hero Fiennes Tiffin as Rhodes

== Production ==
Above the Below was announced by Lionsgate at the 2023 American Film Market with Idris Elba and Martin Owen co-directing the film. Owen created the story for the film, with the script being written by Elizabeth Morris, Matt Mitchell, and Vicki Sargent. The following month it was announced that Elba would also star in the film with Caitlin FitzGerald and Hero Fiennes Tiffin.

Filming began in November 2023 in London, taking place at Pinewood Studios to utilize the underwater studio there, and it was completed by February 2024.

Roger Goula was hired to compose the score.

== Release ==
The film is scheduled to be released on 4 December 2026.
