= @Cafe =

Internet café in New York City

- Founded: April 25, 1995; 30 years ago 12 St. Marks Place; New York City, New York, U.S.
- Founders: Glenn McGinnis; Nicolas Barnes; Chris Townsend
- Dissolved: 1996
- Purpose: Internet café
- Region served: New York City
- Owner: James Casey (manager)

@Cafe, one of New York City's first dedicated internet cafes, was incorporated in early 1995 by Glenn McGinnis, Nicolas Barnes and Chris Townsend and opened its doors on Tuesday, April 25, 1995 with the slogan “Eat, Drink, ‘Net.” Founded at 12 St. Marks Place on the site of the original location of St. Mark's Bookshop, the 2,500 sq foot cafe positioned itself as a place where the formerly solitary pursuits of computing were combined with a social atmosphere of a full bar and restaurant. In addition to the food and drink, the cafe offered dial-up internet services and email accounts through their fly.net web portal. Computer and internet usage was billed at $5 per half-hour. The business idea was inspired by Japanese video game cafes that McGinnis had frequented when he lived in Japan during the 1980s. During the internet's early days when the medium was still mostly unexplored, @Cafe tried to present “the internet at its best,” paying $9,000 a month for a dedicated T1 line and supplying powerful PC or Mac computers at every table.

At the time of @Cafe's opening, the first Netscape browser had just been released; a technological advance that introduced the internet to a more general computer user. @Cafe soon became a center for patrons curious about the internet, such as famous hacker, Phiber Optik, and was also embraced by New York's burgeoning technology sector known as Silicon Alley. @Cafe also made connections with early internet pioneers The WELL, hosting their ten-year anniversary party a few weeks after they opened and was also an early meet up location of the Women's Technology advocacy group Webgrrls.

@Cafe was one of the first businesses that was predicated on monetizing what had previously been the domain of academics and programmers. When it opened, @Cafe was the largest internet-based cafe in New York City and was the only internet cafe with a full kitchen and bar. It played host to a number of high-profile events, including a failed online meeting between the New York and Boston mayors Rudy Giuliani and Thomas Menino, the launch of the Rolling Stones Voodoo Lounge CD-ROM, The Wall Street Journal's Interactive Edition website premier, a Donna Karan men's fragrance and website debut, and a global and interactive New Year's Eve party on December 31, 1995 with the internet cafes CyberJava in Los Angeles, California and CyberSmith in Cambridge, Massachusetts. Corporate clients MTV, MasterCard, IBM and Budweiser also held technology events at the cafe.

The cafe also played host to an early web/television hybrid program called "Encarta On the Record." The monthly program was moderated by journalist Linda Ellerbee, produced by Microsoft and Ellerbee's production company Lucky Duck and combined a live roundtable discussion with web-based resources through the Encarta web portal. The web audience could ask questions to the panel in real time, the audio of the discussion could be streamed and video images of the proceedings were updated every 8 seconds.

In contemporary interviews, Barnes and McGinnis spoke of opening a number of internet-based cafes around the world, where technology novices and professionals could experience the full potential of the internet.

Despite media and public interest, @Cafe never broke even and closed in 1996 before additional locations or franchises could be opened.
