= John Threat =

American computer hacker and entrepreneur (born 1973)

John Lee
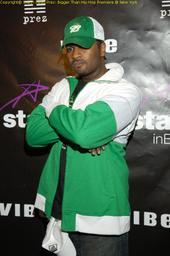
- John Threat (John Lee) at a movie premiere
- Born: July 6, 1973 (age 53); Brooklyn, New York, U.S.
- Other names: John Threat, Corrupt
- Occupations: Programmer, entrepreneur
- Known for: Member of Masters of Deception (MOD), Hacking, member of Decepticons

John Lee (born July 6, 1973), a.k.a. John Threat, is an American computer hacker and entrepreneur. He used the name "Corrupt" as a member of Masters of Deception (MOD), a New York based hacker group in the early 1990s.

As a result of his participation in the Great Hacker War, between MOD and rival hacker group Legion of Doom, he was indicted on federal wiretapping charges in 1992. He pled guilty and was sentenced to one year at a federal detention center. His participation in the Great Hacker War landed him on the cover of Wired Magazine in 1994.

Lee was born on July 6, 1973, in Brooklyn, New York. He grew up in Brownsville, where he was a member of the Decepticons, a Brooklyn-based street gang formed in the early '80s, named after the villains in the Saturday morning cartoon, Transformers. Lee attended Stuyvesant High School and went on to New York University. During his freshman year at NYU, Lee was sentenced to prison for his role in the Great Hacker War.

Lee also has editing, producing, and directing credits in film and television. In 2004, he founded Mediathreat, LLC, a film production company. In 2005, he directed the original documentary "Dead Prez: Bigger than Hip Hop." In 2011, he co-directed the music video for MAKE OUT's single "You Can't Be Friends With Everyone" with Diane Martel.

Lee also gained notoriety in 2001 when he revealed himself as the anonymous editor of UrbanExpose.com, a controversial entertainment gossip website.
