= Caitlin FitzGerald =

American actress

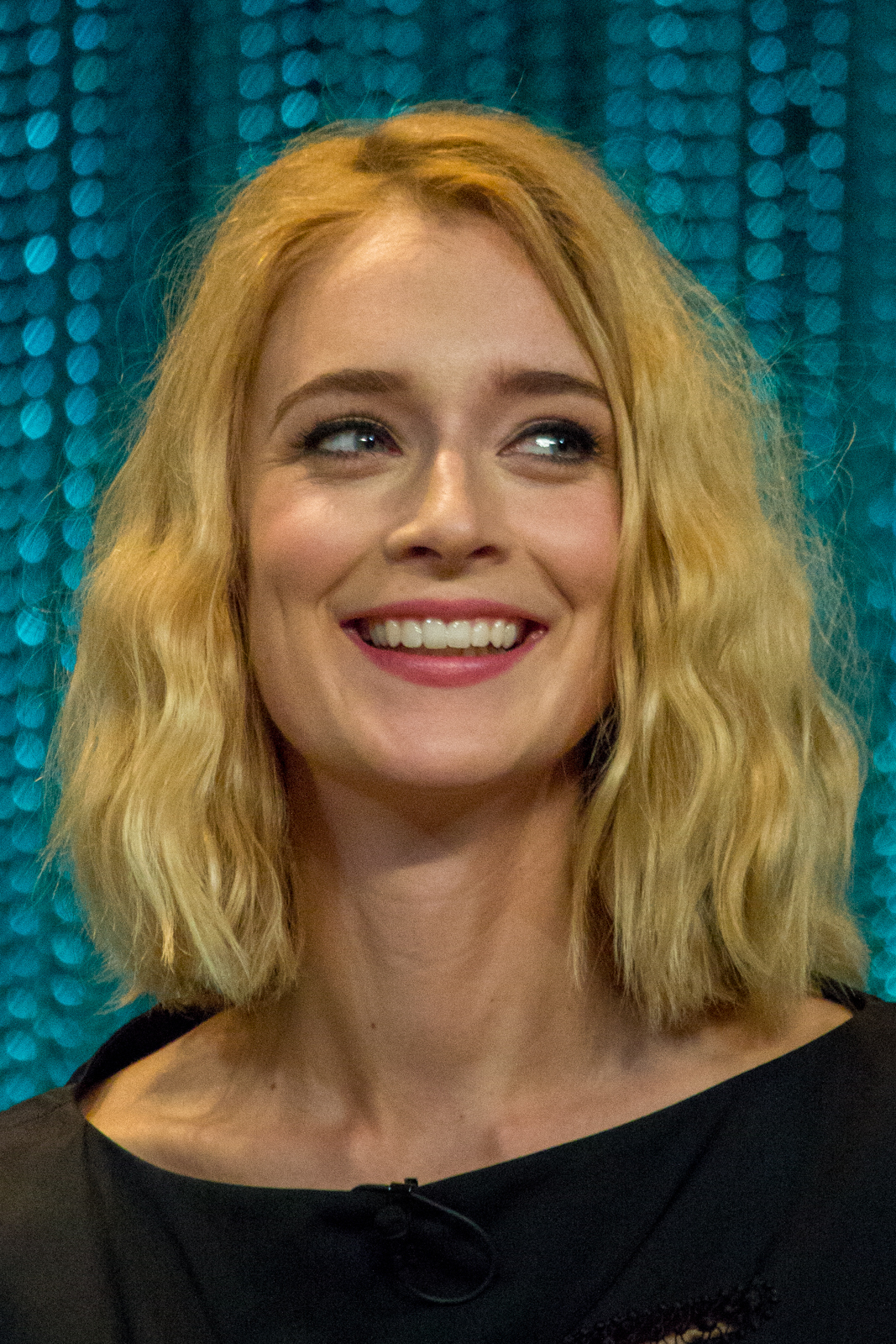
- FitzGerald in 2014
- Occupation: Actress
- Years active: 2008–present
- Spouse: Aidan Turner (m. 2020)
- Children: 1

Caitlin FitzGerald is an American actress. She is known for her roles as Libby Masters in the Showtime drama Masters of Sex (2013–2016) and Simone in Starz series Sweetbitter (2018–2019).

== Early life ==
FitzGerald was raised in Camden, Maine. Her father, Des FitzGerald, an Irish American, is the former CEO of the ContiSea unit of the multinational corporation ContiGroup and the founder of Ducktrap River Fish Farm Inc. Her mother, Pam Allen, is the author of Knitting for Dummies and the founder of the yarn company Quince & Co. FitzGerald first developed an interest in acting as a child and performed in many community theatre and school productions. She was a boarding student and 2002 graduate of Concord Academy in Massachusetts. She later graduated from NYU's Tisch School of the Arts, where she studied drama at the Stella Adler Studio of Acting. FitzGerald also spent time studying Shakespeare at the Royal Academy of Dramatic Art (RADA) in London.

== Career ==
FitzGerald has appeared in Love Simple, It's Complicated, Gossip Girl, Whit Stillman's Damsels in Distress, Blue Bloods, UnREAL and Newlyweds.

In 2010, FitzGerald starred in a production of Hedda Gabler. The play was performed in a private house in New York City to an audience of just twenty-five people. FitzGerald was excited to play "the greatest part written for a woman that isn’t Shakespeare". Ben Brantley of The New York Times said of her performance: "All legs, eyes and cheekbones, with a face that seems made for cinematic close-ups, she’s a hypnotic pleasure to look at." However, he felt she had insufficient gravitas, often bringing to mind "a newly transferred, intimidatingly classy high school senior, perhaps, who is so beyond being merely popular".

In 2010 she also played the role of Benita in "After Hours", the 10th episode of the 1st season of the CBS crime drama Blue Bloods.

In 2012, FitzGerald starred in and co-wrote the screenplay for the independent film Like the Water, set in Maine. The film focuses on the death of a childhood friend, inspired by the sudden death of FitzGerald's Riley School classmate Sabrina Seelig. She also co-starred that year in The Fitzgerald Family Christmas, reuniting with director Ed Burns. In 2013, she starred as Liv in the independent romantic comedy ensemble Mutual Friends directed by Matthew Watts.

FitzGerald starred in the Showtime period drama Masters of Sex. Indiewire has described her character as one of the most underrated in television: "Libby Masters is a character who could easily have come across as insipid instead of likable and poignant ... FitzGerald fully conveys Libby's willowy fragility, her fairly sheltered outlook and girlishness – she sometimes calls her husband 'Daddy'—while making it clear she isn't a simple stand-in for conservative values or cluelessness ... FitzGerald makes Libby's perceptiveness and her transparency clear."

In 2015, she appeared in the indie comedy Adult Beginners from director Ross Katz as Kat, the girlfriend of Jake (Nick Kroll) who dumps him after his tech startup fails and he moves back to his family home. Rose Byrne and Bobby Cannavale co-star.

In June 2017, FitzGerald joined the cast of Robert Krzykowski's film The Man Who Killed Hitler and Then the Bigfoot, co-starring with Sam Elliott and Aidan Turner.

In 2018, she starred in Season 3 of UnREAL. She played Serena, the star of the fictional reality show Everlasting - mirroring a concept similar to The Bachelorette.

In 2025, when Caitlin FitzGerald appeared in Othello at the Theatre Royal Haymarket, London, she projected 'a smooth blend of strength and fearfulness' in the role of Desdemona.

== Personal life ==
In 2017, FitzGerald met actor Aidan Turner. They married in August 2020, and she gave birth to their son in January 2022. They have an 18th-century house in East London.

== Filmography ==
=== Film ===
| Year | Title | Role | Notes |
|---|---|---|---|
| 2008 | A Jersey Christmas | Wellesley | |
| 2009 | Taking Woodstock | Young woman | |
| 2009 | My Last Day with You | Ashley | |
| 2009 | Love Simple | Keith | |
| 2009 | It's Complicated | Lauren Adler | |
| 2011 | Dirty Movie | Bank teller | |
| 2011 | Damsels in Distress | Priss | |
| 2011 | Newlyweds | Katie | |
| 2012 | The Fitzgerald Family Christmas | Connie Fitzgerald | |
| 2012 | Like the Water | Charlie McRill | Also co-writer |
| 2013 | Mutual Friends | Liv | |
| 2014 | Adult Beginners | Kat | |
| 2015 | Manhattan Romance | Theresa | |
| 2016 | Always Shine | Beth | |
| 2016 | Mercy | Melissa | |
| 2017 | The Show | Sylvia | Originally titled This Is Your Death |
| 2017 | All I Wish | Alison | Originally titled A Little Something for Your Birthday |
| 2018 | The Man Who Killed Hitler and Then the Bigfoot | Maxine | |
| 2020 | The Trial of the Chicago 7 | Daphne O'Connor | |
| 2024 | Lost on a Mountain in Maine | Ruth Fendler | |
| TBA | Above the Below | Brooks | |

=== Television ===
| Year | Title | Role | Notes |
|---|---|---|---|
| 2008 | Law & Order: Special Victims Unit | Anna / Natalie Bleers | Episode: "Wildlife" |
| 2009 | Mercy | Erika | Episode: "Hope You're Good, Smiley Face" |
| 2010 | How to Make It in America | Rachel's friend | Episode: "Paper, Denim + Dollars" |
| 2010 | Blue Bloods | Benita | Episode: "After Hours" |
| 2011 | Gossip Girl | Epperly Lawrence | Recurring role |
| 2013–2016 | Masters of Sex | Libby Masters | Main role |
| 2014 | Project Runway | Herself | Guest judge, 1 episode |
| 2015 | The Walker | Maggie | Guest role |
| 2016 | New Girl | Diane | Episode: "Return to Sender" |
| 2016 | Rectify | Chloe | Recurring role |
| 2017 | Code Black | Dr. Gretchen Kerr | Guest role |
| 2018 | Unreal | Serena | Main role |
| 2018–2019 | Sweetbitter | Simone | Main role |
| 2018–2019 | Succession | Tabitha Hayes | Recurring role |
| 2021–2022 | Station Eleven | Elizabeth | Miniseries; recurring role |
| 2022 | Inventing Anna | Mags | Recurring role |
| 2022 | Our Time | Stella Cooper | TV film |
| 2025 | We Were Liars | Penny Sinclair | |
