= Sabrina Seelig =

American writer (1984–2007)

- Born: June 15, 1984
- Died: June 5, 2007 (aged 22); Wyckoff Heights Medical Center, Wyckoff Heights, New York, U.S
- Occupation: Writer

Sabrina Seelig (b. June 15, 1984, d. June 5, 2007) was an American writer who died under suspicious circumstances at the Wyckoff Heights Medical Center in Brooklyn, New York.

== Life ==
Sabrina Seelig was born in Philadelphia, Pennsylvania, and attended Abington Friends School, where she became interested in reading and writing.

At 11, Seelig and her family moved to Rockland, Maine, and she began to attend the Riley School, where she met and befriended Caitlin FitzGerald, who was her best friend until her death. Here, she began directing theater productions, and started an ice cream stand called Lulu's which is still operating. Seelig attended Camden Hills Regional High School, and, after graduating, travelled Europe.

In 2002, Seelig attended Hampshire College, continuing until moving to New York City in 2004. She would later attend Hunter College, pursuing a degree in classics, from 2006 until her death. Seelig waitressed to put herself through college. After meeting while Seelig was working at the Pink Pony, Seelig began dating Polish artist Jan Baracz, 25 years her senior.

== Career ==
In 2005, Seelig became involved with Brooklyn arts journal The Brooklyn Rail, and befriended its founder Phong Bui. She would go on to have three book reviews published in the journal, as well as three posthumous short stories.

Seelig is also the author of an unpublished novel, The Romans.

== Death ==
On May 29th, Seelig finished her dinner shift at Tree, a restaurant in the East Village, and proceeded home to her apartment in Bushwick to work on a Latin paper. She worked through the night and into the morning, taking Ephedra, a few beers, and Valerian to stay focused.

Around 10:45 am, she called 911, saying she had been experiencing serious vomiting and dizziness. While waiting for the ambulance, she called Poison Control, who were unhelpful, and was coherent when speaking. She also tried calling Baracz and a friend, but they did not pick up.

At 11:05 am, she arrived at Wyckoff Heights Medical Center, alert and awake. Emergency room doctor Dali Mardach gave her anti-nausea drugs Phenergan and Trigan, and after she thrashed, a total of two doses of Ativan at 1:15 and 1:45 pm. Mardach also ordered her wrists restrained.

There is no consensus on what happened afterwards. Initial blood tests showed Seelig was low on salt, but another one was not performed for several hours. For more than three hours, 2:35 to 6:10, Seelig's vital signs were not entered in her chart, a violation of procedure by nurse Joyce Smith.

At 6:10, either Mardach or Smith, there is disagreement, found Seelig in an overflow area, heartbeat racing and mouth foaming.

At 8 pm, friends of Seelig found her in Wyckoff, intubated and in a coma. The next day, Seelig's parents flew to New York and transferred her to NewYork-Presbyterian Hospital. She was declared brain-dead on June 4, and was taken off life support on June 5.

The medical examiner concluded Seelig died of water intoxication. At the ensuing medical malpractice trial, the plaintiff's lawyer argued Seelig died of hypoxia induced by the sedatives. The hospital's lawyer argued Seelig died of a heart attack originating from the Ephedra.

== Bibliography ==
Year	Title	Published In	Notes
2007	Affair	Brooklyn Rail	Short story, published posthuomusly
2007	The Time of the Darkest Color	Brooklyn Rail	Short story, published posthuomusly
2007	The Moment	Brooklyn Rail	Short story, published posthuomusly
