= Rim Jong Hyok =

North Korean hacker

- 림종혁
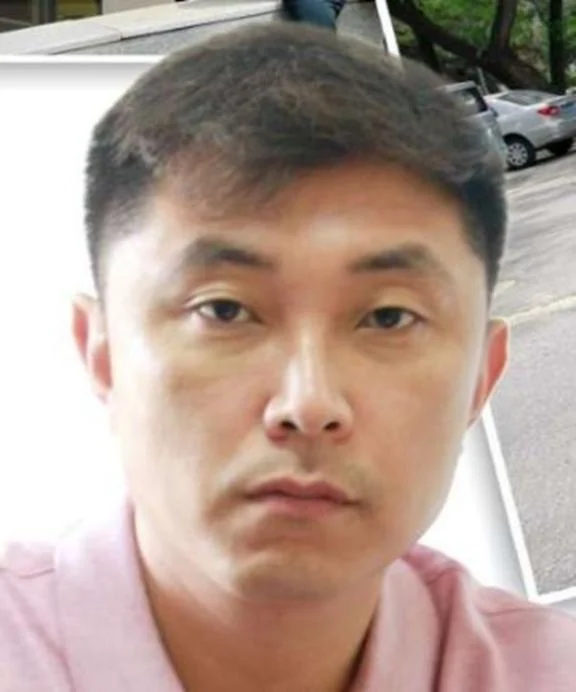
- Born: North Korea
- Organization: Andariel
- Criminal charges: Conspiracy
- Criminal status: Fugitive

Rim Jong Hyok (Korean: 림종혁) is a North Korean hacker and a member of the Andariel, a hacker group controlled by the Reconnaissance General Bureau.

== Life ==
Nothing is known about his early life except that he was born in North Korea.

=== Hacking career ===
In 2021, Hyok funneled money, the money being bitcoin, from ransomware programs that were used against both U.S. and South Korean targets, specifically the attacking of computer and server systems in American hospitals and healthcare institutions and other systems affiliated with United States affiliated organizations like NASA and the Department of Justice, in order to continue funding these operations. The attacks against the health care institutions caused many classified personal documents, including medical records, being locked and possibly stolen. Hospitals were affected in Arkansas, Colorado, Connecticut, Florida, and Kansas. He also illegally accessed computers affiliated with the U.S. military, some being on bases, and stole classified documents belonging to the United States. In 2022, he was caught stealing data for classified military aircraft.

In July 2024, Hyok was officially indicted on conspiracy to launder money by a Kansas grand jury with Hyok not having an attorney during the indictment. In total, he laundered hundreds of thousands of money to fund operations for North Korean hacker groups. The United States Department of State offered USD$10 million in more information that leads to the arrest of Hyok.
