= San Francisco Women on the Web =

American nonprofit organization

San Francisco Women on the Web (SFWOW)
- Founded: 1998
- Type: Non-governmental organization
- Purpose: women, computer, Internet
- Location: San Francisco, California
- Method: training, activism
- Website: www.sfwow.org (inactive)

San Francisco Women on the Web (SFWOW) is a nonprofit organization based in San Francisco, California. It works to serve, educate and empower women in technology through professional development, support, and networking opportunities. In 1998, the organization created a nationally recognized awards program called the Top 25 Women on the Web, a program that continued through 2007.

== History ==
San Francisco Women on the Web began as a chapter of Webgrrls. The volunteers of that chapter broke away in 1998 and formed an independent organization and began discussions and paperwork to achieve nonprofit status, which they did in 2000. In 1998, while still a part of Webgrrls, the San Francisco volunteers created an awards program called the Top 25 Women on the Web, which was held up to 2001 and garnered regular press attention, including national coverage. Membership (non-dues) totaled 1807 in 2007. Volunteer-run, it organized workshops, from HTML to Java, events, monthly meetings, study groups, coffee klatches, and "scrappies" a kind of happy hour networking gathering.

== In the news ==
- "Women Revel at Web Awards". Wired. January 21, 1999.
- "The San Francisco branch of Women on the Web met Wednesday to recognize the Top 25 Women of the Web", by Ashley Craddock 26 January 1999, ZDNet News
- Mayfield, Kendra (April 24, 2001). "Women Who Think Differently". Wired.
- "25 Top Web Women Honored as Movers, Shapers", by Nancy Schaadt 17 May 2001, WEnews
- "Tech women experience power surge", 15 November 2002, San Francisco Business Times

== See also ==
- DC Web Women
- Webgrrls
