= Aliza Sherman =

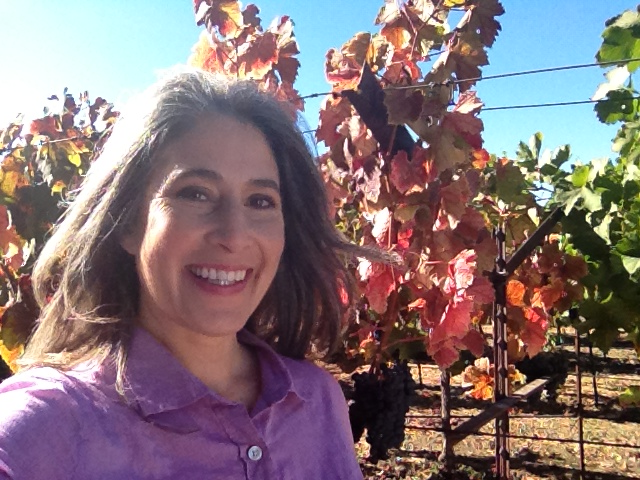
- Aliza Sherman, September 2012
- Born: December 19, 1964 (age 61); Honolulu, Hawaii
- Occupations: author, blogger, lecturer, entrepreneur
- Website: Official website

Aliza Sherman, also known as Aliza Pilar Sherman, Aliza Sherman Risdahl, and Cybergrrl (born December 19, 1964) is an American new media entrepreneur, author, blogger, women's issues activist, and international speaker. She is known for her expertise in online marketing and networking. Her primary focus includes addressing women's issues on the Internet, while empowering women to expand their role and involvement in progressive technology and the new media industry. In 1995, Sherman was named by Newsweek magazine as one of the "Top 50 People Who Matter Most on the Internet". She was one of only three women on the list. In 2009, she was named by Fast Company magazine as one of the "Most Influential Women in Technology", in the Blogger category. She was born in Honolulu, Hawaii.

== Professional background ==
In January 1995, Sherman founded Cybergrrl, Inc., which is the first full-service Internet company owned by a woman. Two months later, she established Webgrrls International, known as the first global women's new media networking organization. Sherman is known for launching the first three general interest Web sites for women, located at Cybergrrl.com, Webgrrls.com, and Femina.com, predating other major women's Web sites.

She is credited with coining the term "Webgrrls" to refer to women with Web sites.

In addition to Internet, Web site, and organizational development, Sherman has written twelve books, some of which address hindrances facing women in their attempt to increase their participation and involvement on the Internet. She identifies the issues that are present in various environments, while offering solutions, then empowering women to remove the barriers and move forward to accomplish their individual and professional goals. She has spoken about issues pertaining to women and the Internet at international conferences and events, including "Technology Conference for Women's NGOs" at The Hague, Netherlands; "Links Education Technology Conference" in Stockholm, Sweden; "1999 Women Leaders Conference" in Wellington, New Zealand; and "1999 Women's Summit of the Americas" in Buenos Aires, Argentina.

=== Cybergrrl ===
In January 1995, Sherman founded Cybergrrl, Inc. She spent 1995 through 1999 running the organization and speaking about the Internet for women at colleges and universities including Harvard Business School, Simmons College Graduate School of Management, Rutgers University, New York University, and Columbia University, School of Business.

=== Webgrrls ===
In March 1995, Sherman established Webgrrls International, which is a hybrid of online and offline networking, education and mentoring for women interested in technology-related fields. The initial goal of Webgrrls was to provide a way for women to meet other women who were interested in and knowledgeable about the Internet. Webgrrls offered job lists and online training to members. Webgrrls started as a series of meetups in New York City with their initial meeting held at @Cafe on St Marks Place. During its first year, the organization grew to include over 100 chapters and networking groups throughout the world.

Beginning in 1998, some chapters began to establish their independence from Webgrrls. The San Francisco Chapter left in August to form San Francisco Women on the Web followed by the Austin chapter, which formed "Her Domain". In April 1999, the Washington, D.C. chapter followed suit, forming DC Web Women. By the end of November 2000, nearly one third of Webgrrls' 30,000 members, primarily those from the US and Canada, left Webgrrls and established a separate organization, called DigitalEve. The Internet: A Historical Encyclopedia explores the reasons for these chapters and members leaving Webgrrls. In 1999, Sherman resigned from Cybergrrl, Inc. The companies Cybergrrl, Inc. and Webgrrls International are run by CEO Kevin Kennedy, while the CTO is Nelly Yusupova.

=== Blogging ===
Sherman is a blogger with several blogs of her own including Babyfruit and AlizaSherman.com. She was a contributor for WebWorkerDaily.com, Mashable, and WorkitMom.com.

=== Podcasting ===
Sherman is the creator and former host of "Quick and Dirty Tips Digital Marketer", a podcast on online tools. Her radio credits include producing segments for Wyoming Public Radio, Alaska Public Radio Network, and Marketplace on NPR.

=== Consultancy ===
Sherman is a member of the American Association of University Women's Educational Foundation Commission on Technology, Gender, and Teacher Education exploring the technology gender gap in schools culminating in a report called Tech-Savvy: Educating Girls in the New Computer Age (2000). She has served as an advisor to various nonprofit organizations for girls, including GenAustin, hipGuide, College Broadband.

In 2003, Sherman established a digital consulting and social media marketing firm, called Conversify. In 2010, she launched the strategic digital and mobile consulting agency, Mediaegg LLC, which provides strategic digital consulting.

== Personal background ==
In 2001, Sherman relocated to Cheyenne, Wyoming from New York City, where she worked in public relations for the Wyoming Business Council. She is also one of the founders of the Women's Internet History Project. She currently resides in Alaska.

== Honors and awards ==
- Avon Spirit of Enterprise Award

== Published works ==
- Sherman, Aliza. Working Together Against Violence Against Women, Rosen Publishing Group, 1996. ISBN 978-0823922581
- Sherman, Aliza. Everything You Need to Know About Placing Your Baby for Adoption, Rosen Publishing Group, 1997. ISBN 978-0823922666
- Sherman, Aliza. Cybergrrl: A Woman's Guide to the World Wide Web, Ballantine, 1998. ISBN 978-0345423825
- Sherman, Aliza. Cybergrrl @ Work: Tips and Inspiration for the Professional You, Penguin Putnam, 2001. ISBN 978-0425176566
- Sherman, Aliza. PowerTools for Women in Business: 10 Ways to Succeed in Life and Work, Entrepreneur Press, 2001. ISBN 978-1891984327
- Sherman, Aliza. The Everything Blogging Book: Publish Your Ideas, Get Feedback, and Create Your Own Worldwide Network, Adams Media, 2006. ISBN 978-1593375898
- Sherman, Aliza. Streetwise Ecommerce: Establish Your Online Business, Expand Your Reach, and Watch Your Profits Soar, Adams Media, 2007. ISBN 978-1598691443
- Sherman, Aliza. The Complete Idiot's Guide to Crowdsourcing: Tap the Power of Many to Get Things Done, Alpha/Penguin, 2011. ISBN 978-1615640928
- Sherman, Aliza. Mom, Incorporated: A Guide to Business + Baby, Sellers Publishing, 2011. ISBN 978-1416206514
- Sherman, Aliza. Social Media Engagement For Dummies, For Dummies, 2013. ISBN 978-1118530191
- Sherman, Aliza. The Happy, Healthy Nonprofit: Strategies for Impact without Burnout, Wiley, 2016. ISBN 978-1119251118
- Sherman, Aliza. Cannabis and CBD for Health and Wellness: An Essential Guide for Using Nature's Medicine to Relieve Stress, Anxiety, Chronic Pain, Inflammation, and More, Ten Speed Press, 2019. ISBN 978-1984856852
