= Urchin (2007 film) =

- Directed by: John Harlacher
- Written by: John Harlacher
- Starring: Sebastian Montoya; Rick Poli; Larry Swansen; Donald Silva; Barbara King; Eric Corley
- Cinematography: Luke Leonard
- Edited by: Dave Buchwald
- Music by: Robert Edridge-Waks; Ronnie Boykins Jr. Shakerleg
- Production company: The Enemy
- Distributed by: Vanguard Cinema
- Release date: February 17, 2007
- Running time: 105 minutes
- Country: United States
- Language: English

Urchin is a 2007 film directed by John Harlacher and starring Sebastian Montoya, Rick Poli, Larry Swansen, Donald Silva, and Barbara King. The screenplay concerns a homeless boy living in a New York City underground mole people community called Scum-City.

== Plot ==
Urchin is the story of a child who lives in Scum City. When the Old Man came to Scum City, a homeless camp in the Manhattan tunnels, his story seemed wild. He was from a kingdom deep within the earth, he said, and was sent to find the five nobles who got lost up here. He had a map that would lead him and his followers back to this paradise, and a blue crystal called The Blessing, that when smoked granted the clarity and vision needed to complete great tasks.

Some believed. They were allowed to stay.

The Kid believes. Abused and tormented, he escaped the city shelter and fled to the streets, where he survived by wit and blood until he found Scum City. He will fulfil the Old Man's prophecy; he will get to paradise.

But someone else believes. The Old Man had a bodyguard once, a powerful little man called Goliath whose lungs and mind are rotting away. In his dementia he has committed to the ritual murder of innocents and the capture of the map held fast by the Old Man.

This is the story of a child trapped in a world of violence, degradation, wonder, and discovery. As he battles the evils of the street to save the Old Man and the future of Scum City he meets Julia, a young girl in need of protection. He struggles to decipher the true motives of the Old Man and Goliath, while safeguarding Julia and the map that leads to Paradise.

== Reception ==
The movie was criticised for its direction and acting, with Julia Wallace in The Village Voice calling it a "pointless exercise in subversion".
