= Chris Goggans =

American computer security figure

- Other name: Erik Bloodaxe
- Occupations: Computer security consultant, programmer, editor
- Known for: Legion of Doom, Phrack

Chris Goggans, also known by the handle Erik Bloodaxe, is an American computer security figure associated with the Legion of Doom hacker group. He was also an editor of Phrack magazine.

== Career ==
Goggans was associated with the Legion of Doom during the late 1980s and early 1990s. Around 1990–1991, he and other Legion members founded Comsec, a computer security firm that was no longer operating by 1992.

He later worked as a senior network security engineer for WheelGroup.

Goggans has been credited as a co-author of several computer security books, including Implementing Internet Security, Internet Security Professional Reference, Windows NT Security, and The Complete Internet Business Toolkit.

== Public statements ==
At SummerCon in 1995, Goggans commented on the lack of coordination within the hacker community and suggested that hackers might focus their efforts on a foreign country, giving France as an example.

In a 1994 interview, Goggans said that malicious hacking was contrary to his understanding of hacker ethics, stating that he had never destroyed data or intentionally damaged systems.

== Law-enforcement attention ==
Goggans was searched by the United States Secret Service on March 1, 1990, but was not charged.

According to Bill Apro and Graeme Hammond's book Hackers: The Hunt for Australia's Most Infamous Computer Cracker, an intercepted 1990 phone call involving Goggans and Australian hacker Nahshon Even-Chaim was later used as evidence in proceedings against Even-Chaim in Australia. The book states that the call included discussion of accessing systems belonging to Execucom, a Texas-based software company.
