= Masters of Deception =

Hacker group

- Formation: Late 1980s
- Purpose: Hacking/Phreaking
- Location: United States
- Origin: New York
- Founders: Acid Phreak, Scorpion, HAC

Masters of Deception (MOD) was a New York–based group of hackers, most widely known in media for their exploits of telephone company infrastructure and their later prosecution.

== Origin ==
Phiber Optik (Mark Abene) was an early member of MOD

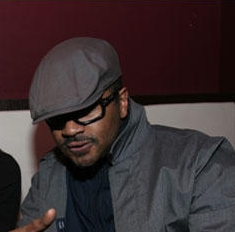
Corrupt (John Lee) was a member of MOD

MOD's initial membership grew from meetings on Loop-Around Test Lines that led to collaborations to hack Regional Bell Operating Company phone switches and the various minicomputers and mainframes used to administer the telephone network. They worked underground, using handles to hide their identities.

Acid Phreak founded the Masters of Deception with Scorpion and HAC. The name itself was, among other things, a mockery of Legion of Doom (LOD), as 'M' is one letter up in the alphabet from 'L', although the name originally was a flexible acronym that could be used to identify membership in situations where anonymity would be the best course of action. It could stand for "Millions of Dollars" just as easily as "Masters of Deception."

It is claimed that the mockery of the LOD name was a statement to the underground that LOD had lost its direction. Several LOD members were close friends of MOD who had been raided and indicted by the government, causing the majority of those who remained to drop out of the underground for safety reasons. In their absence, LOD largely fell into disarray causing the disagreement and disillusionment that led Phiber Optik to align himself with MOD in an effort to restore the direction of the spirit of underground hacking.

== Members ==
The original Masters of Deception included: Mark Abene ("Phiber Optik"), Paul Stira ("Scorpion"), Elias Ladopoulos ("Acid Phreak"), HAC, John Lee ("Corrupt") and Julio Fernandez ("Outlaw").

Additional members who have remained anonymous include: Supernigger (also of DPAK), Wing, Nynex Phreak, Billy_The_Kid, Crazy Eddie, The Plague, ZOD, Seeker, Red Knight (who was also a member of Cult of the Dead Cow), Lord Micro, n00gie and peaboy (a.k.a. MCI Sprinter).

== Philosophy ==
Masters of Deception operated differently in many respects to previous hacking groups. Although they openly shared information with each other, they took a controversial view on sharing information outside the group. It was believed that access to MOD's knowledge should be earned via degrees of initiation and a proven respect for the craft, rather than releasing powerful information into the wild where it could be used for nefarious purposes. A demonstration of responsibility on the part of the initiate was required. This informal compartmentalized protection of more sensitive knowledge was a structure originally employed by LOD in the 1980s, rather successfully. According to Lex Luthor, "I realized early on that only certain people can be trusted with certain information, and certain types of information can be trusted to no one. Giving out useful things to irresponsible people would inevitably lead to whatever thing it was being abused and no longer useful. I was very possessive of my information and frequently withheld things from my articles."

== Fall ==
As a result of a major nationwide investigation by a joint FBI/Secret Service task force, five of MOD's members were indicted in 1992 in federal court. The case was prosecuted by the U.S. Attorney's Office for the Southern District of New York by Assistant U.S. Attorneys Stephen Fishbein and Geoffrey S. Berman. Within the next six months (in 1993), all five pleaded guilty and were sentenced to either probation or prison. After the sentencing of Abene, 2600: The Hacker Quarterly, Winter 1993-94, had on its cover a rag doll labeled "BERMAN" stabbed by a dagger.

== In popular culture ==
- Singer/songwriter Poe referenced the MOD with the phrase "MOD are you out there?" from her 1995 song "Hello".
