= Legion of Doom (hacker group) =

American hacker group

Legion of Doom aka LOD & LOD/H
- Formation: 1984 Recreation: 2015
- Founder: Lex Luthor
- Dissolved: 1990
- Purpose: Hacking
- Location: United States
- Products: LOD Technical Journals
- Affiliations: Masters of Deception; MindVox; Cult of the Dead Cow

The Legion of Doom (LOD) was an American hacker group founded by a hacker known as Lex Luthor after a rift with his previous group, the Knights of Shadow. LOD was active from the 1980s to the early 2000s, but was most active from 1984 to 1991. Today, Legion of Doom ranks as one of the more influential hacking groups in the history of technology. The name is apparently a reference to the antagonists of Challenge of the Superfriends.

At different points in the group's history, LOD was split into LOD and LOD/LOH (Legion of Doom/Legion of Hackers) for the members that were more skilled at hacking than pure phreaking.

Another hacking group existed simultaneously, called MOD, short for the Masters of Deception. While the ideologies of LOD and MOD differed, there was a cross-over between the members of the groups, so the actions of the members can be difficult to attribute. Unlike the hacking group MOD, there are different opinions regarding what the Legion of Doom is. LOD published the Legion of Doom Technical Journals and contributed to the overall pool of hacking knowledge. They claimed that they did not cause direct harm to the phone systems and computer networks they accessed. Still, at the time, any tampering with the phone systems was considered damaging, and many LOD members were raided and prosecuted by law enforcement for causing alleged damage to systems (Grant, Darden and Riggs, etc.).

== Members of LOD ==
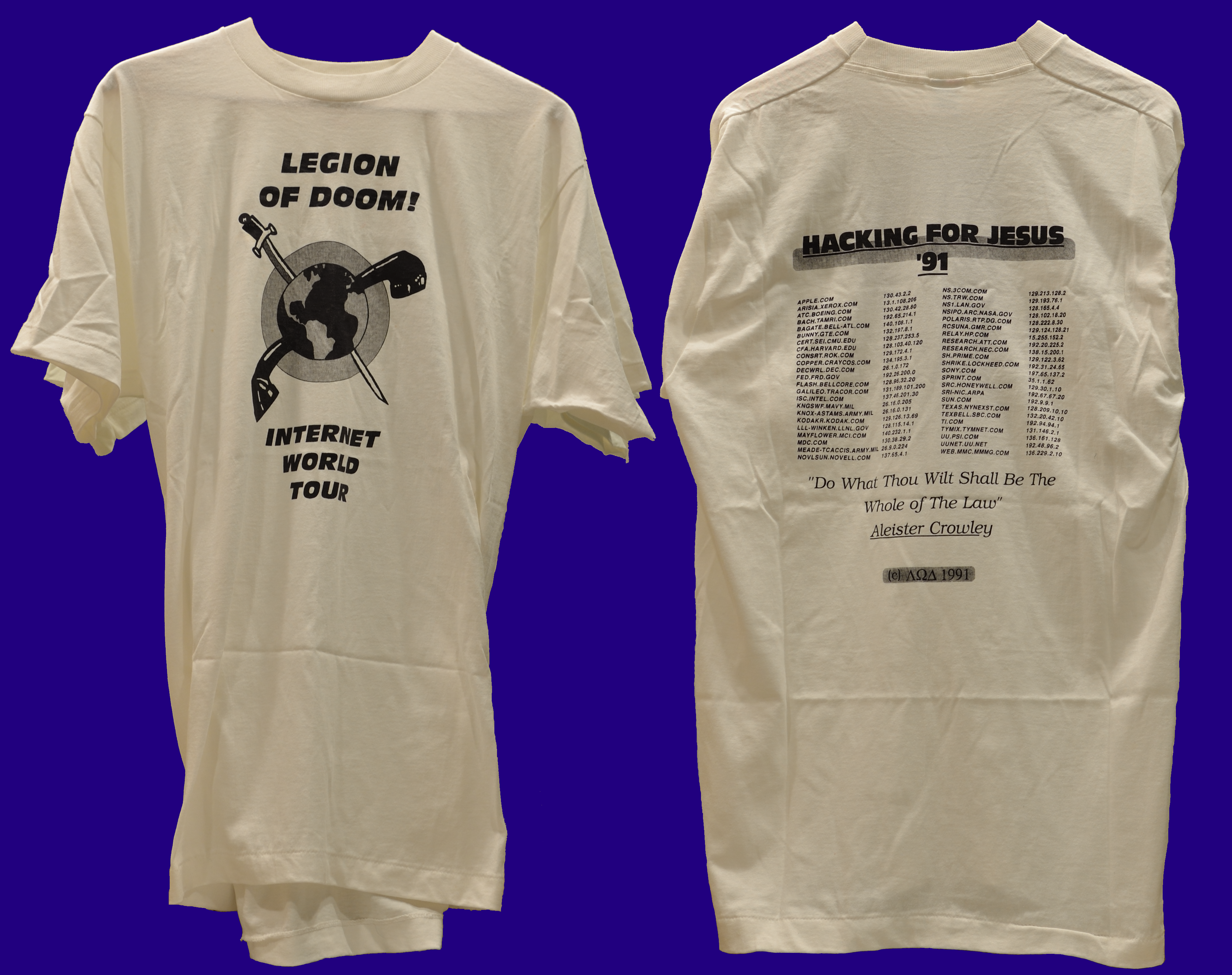
1991 Legion of Doom T-shirt created by Chris Goggans 'Erik Bloodaxe'.

As of 2012, it is unknown what happened to individual members of the Legion of Doom. A small handful of the higher-profile LOD members who are accounted for includes: "Lex Luthor", "Erik Bloodaxe", "Mark Tabas", "Karl Marx", "Agrajag the Prolonged", "Automatic Jack", "Bill From RNOC", "Lord Digital", "The Mentor", "Doctor Who", "Dead Lord", "Phiber Optik", who was a member of both LOD and Masters of Deception (MOD), and "Terminus".

Alumni of the Fraternal Order of the Legion of Doom (Lambda Omega Delta)
Handle	Entered	Exited	Location	Reasons for leaving
Lex Luthor	Early 84		Florida	
Karl Marx	Early 84	Late 85	Colorado	Bust w/Tabas..College
Mark Tabas	Early 84	Late 85	Colorado	Too numerous to list
The Boca Bandit	Early 83	Late 84	Florida	High School/College
Agrajag the Prolonged	Early-84	Late 85	California	Loss of Interest
King Blotto	Early 84	Late 85	Ohio	College
Blue Archer	Early 84	Late 87	Texas	College
EBA	Early 84		Texas	
Dr Dos	Early 84	Late 87	New Jersey	Bust- FBI / MIT
The Dragyn	Early 84	Late 86	Minnesota	Loss of Interest
Unknown Soldier	Early 84	Early 85	Florida	Bust-Toll Fraud
Sharp Razor	Late 84	Early 86	New Jersey	Bust-Compuserve Abuse
Sir Francis Drake	Late 84	Early 86	California	Loss of Interest
Paul Muad'dib (Jeremiah Beckingham)	Late 84	Early 89	Toronto, ONT	Loss of Interest
Phucked Agent 04	Late 84	Late 87	California	College
X-Man	Late 84	Mid 85	New York	Bust-Blue Boxing
Randy Smith	Late 84	Mid 85	Missouri	Bust-Credit Fraud
Steve Dahl	Early 85	Early 86	Illinois	Bust-Credit Fraud
The Warlock	Early 85	Early 86	Florida	Loss of Interest
Terminal Man	Early 85	Late 85	Massachusetts	Expelled from Group
Dr. Who	Early 85	Late 89	Massachusetts	Several Reasons
The Videosmith	Early 86	Late 87	Pennsylvania	Paranoia
Kerrang Khan	Early 86	Mid 89	"London UK"	Loss of Interest
Gary Seven	Early 86	Mid 88	Florida	Loss of Interest
The Marauder	Early 86	Mid 89	Connecticut	Loss of Interest
Silver Spy	Late 86	Late 87	Massachusetts	College
Bill from RNOC	Early 87	Late 87	New York	Bust-Hacking
The Leftist	Mid 87	Late 89	Georgia	Bust-Hacking
Phantom Phreaker	Mid 87		Illinois	
Doom Prophet	Mid 87		Illinois	
Jester Sluggo	Mid 87		North Dakota	
Carrier Culprit	Mid 87	Mid 88	Pennsylvania	Loss of Interest
SysOp	Mid 87	Early 90	Washington	Bust-Hacking
Master of Impact	Mid 87	Mid 88	California	Loss of Interest
Thomas Covenant	Early 88	Early 90	New York	Bust-Hacking
The Mentor	Mid 88	Early 90	Texas	Retired after US Secret Service raid
Necron 99	Mid 88	Late 89	Georgia	Bust-Hacking
Control C	Mid 88	Early 90	Michigan	
Prime Suspect	Mid 88		New York	
The Prophet	Mid 88	Late 89	Georgia	Bust-Hacking
Phiber Optik	Early 89	Early 90	New York	Bust-Hacking
CompuPhreak	Early 84	Early 87	Florida	Started a Business
Djinn	Early 90	Early 01	Georgia	Retired

== Internal and external battles of LOD ==
LOD was against wanton destruction of hacked computers. Gary Cohen "Terminal Man" was dismissed from the group for this reason. Other disagreements led to infighting between Erik Bloodaxe and Mark Tabas. A war with MOD was undertaken, and Erik Bloodaxe led as LOD's general. While Bloodaxe was active in this regard, other LOD members were less so.

== Projects of LOD ==
In 1992, several members of LOD came together and founded LODCOM, Inc., which collected old hacker bulletin board messages for an archive, which was to be sold. Most, if not all, of this material later ended up on textfiles.com. Marauder formed LOD.COM as a consulting company, and several ex-LOD members had accounts on the system. In the late 1990s, a root DNS server had an illicit new TLD of .LOD for over a year. The business name "LOD Communications" arose sometime in the late 80s when Frank Carson (aka Basketball Jones - one of the few "Unknown to the public" LOD Members) registered the name & applied for a CT Tax ID to enable Marauder to get on the Bellcore technical document mailing list.

== See also ==
- Great Hacker War
- The Hacker Crackdown
- Masters of Deception
