= Mark Abene =

American InfoSec expert and former hacker (born 1972)

- Abene in July 2008
- Born: February 23, 1972 (age 54); New York City, New York, U.S.
- Other name: Phiber Optik
- Occupations: Infosec expert, programmer, cryptographer, entrepreneur
- Known for: Hacking, phreaking, infosec

Mark Abene (born February 23, 1972) is an American information security expert and entrepreneur, originally from New York City. Better known by his pseudonym Phiber Optik, he was once a member of the hacker groups Legion of Doom and Masters of Deception.

Phiber Optik was a high-profile hacker in the 1980s and early 1990s, appearing in The New York Times, Harper's, Esquire, and in debates and on television. He is an important figure in the 1995 nonfiction book Masters of Deception: The Gang That Ruled Cyberspace (ISBN 978-0-06-092694-6).

== Early life ==
Abene's first contact with computers was at around 9 years of age at a local department store, where he would often pass the time while his parents shopped. His first computer was a TRS-80 MC-10 with 4 kilobytes of RAM, a 32-column screen, no lower case, and a cassette tape recorder to load and save programs. As was customary at the time, the computer connected to a television set for use as a monitor.

After receiving the gifts of a RAM upgrade (to 20K) and a 300 baud modem from his parents, he used his computer to access CompuServe and shortly after discovered the world of dialup BBSes via people he met on CompuServe's "CB simulator", the first nationwide online chat. On some of these BBSes, Abene discovered dialups and guest accounts to DEC minicomputers running the RSTS/E and TOPS-10 operating systems as part of the BOCES educational program in Long Island, New York. Accessing those DEC minicomputers he realized there was a programming environment that was much more powerful than that of his own home computer, and so he began taking books out of the library in order to learn the programming languages that were now available to him. This and the ability to remotely save and load back programs that would still be there the next time he logged in had a profound effect on Abene, who came to view his rather simple computer as a window into a much larger world.

== Legal tribulations ==
On January 24, 1990, Abene and other MOD members had their homes searched and property seized by the U.S. Secret Service, largely based on government suspicions of having caused AT&T Corporation's network crash just over a week earlier on January 15 (Abene was personally accused by the Secret Service of having done as much, during the search and seizure). Some weeks later, AT&T admitted that the crash was the result of a flawed software update to the switching systems on their long-distance network, thus, human error on their part. In February 1991, Abene was arrested and charged with computer tampering and computer trespass in the first degree, New York state offenses. Laws at the time were considered a “gray area” concerning information security. Abene, who was a minor at the time, pleaded "not guilty" to the first two offenses and ultimately accepted a plea agreement to a lesser misdemeanor charge, and was sentenced to 35 hours of community service.

Abene and four other members of the Masters of Deception were also arrested in December 1991 and indicted by a Manhattan federal grand jury on July 8, 1992, on an 11-count charge. The indictment relied heavily on evidence collected by court-approved wire tapping of telephone conversations between MOD members. According to U.S. Attorney Otto Obermaier, it was the "first investigative use of court-authorized wiretaps to obtain conversations and data transmissions of computer hackers" in the United States.

After serving the one-year sentence at the Federal Prison Camp in Schuylkill, Pennsylvania, Abene was released in November 1994. In January 1995, a huge celebration called "Phiberphest '95" was held in his honor at Manhattan's Irving Plaza ballroom/nightclub. In Time, Joshua Quittner called him "the first underground hero of the Information Age, the Robin Hood of cyberspace." Upon leaving jail, Phiber Optik made the @Cafe his hang out spot.

== Social protests ==
A statement made by U.S. Attorney Otto Obermeier in conjunction with the indication was "The message that ought to be delivered with this indictment is that such conduct will not be tolerated, irrespective of the age of the particular accused or their ostensible purpose," was interpreted by Abene's supporters to mean that MOD was made an example of, to show that the authorities could handle the perceived "hacker threat". During sentencing, Judge Stanton said that "the defendant stands as a symbol here today," and that "hacking crimes constitute a real threat to the expanding information highway", reinforcing the view that a relatively harmless "teacher" was judged as a symbol for all hackers.

== Professional life ==
Abene has spoken on the subject of security in many publications such as The New York Times, The Washington Post, The Wall Street Journal, and Time. He has appeared as a speaker at both hacker and security industry conferences worldwide and frequently visits universities to speak to students about information security.

Abene made his acting début as "The Inside Man" in the film Urchin, completed in 2006 and released in the US in February 2007, in which other hacker notables such as Dave Buchwald and Emmanuel Goldstein can be seen.
