= Steve Jackson Games, Inc. v. United States Secret Service =

Lawsuit

- Court: United States District Court for the Western District of Texas
- Full case name: Steve Jackson Games, Inc., Steve Jackson, Elizabeth McCoy, Walter Milliken, Steffan O'Sullivan v. United States Secret Service
- Decided: March 12, 1993
- Docket nos.: A 91 CA 346
- Citation: 816 F. Supp. 432

Case history
- Subsequent actions: Affirmed, 36 F.3d 457 (5th Cir. 1994).

Court membership
- Judge sitting: Sam Sparks

Steve Jackson Games, Inc. v. United States Secret Service, 816 F. Supp. 432 (W.D. Tex. 1993), was a lawsuit arising from a 1990 raid by the United States Secret Service on the headquarters of Steve Jackson Games (SJG) in Austin, Texas. The raid, along with the Secret Service's unrelated Operation Sundevil, was influential in the founding of the Electronic Frontier Foundation.

== Raid ==
In October 1988, Bell South became aware that a proprietary memorandum relating to its 9-1-1 system had been posted on a bulletin board system (BBS) in Illinois. This was reported to the Secret Service in July 1989. In February 1990, the Secret Service found that the document had been posted on the "Phoenix" BBS in Austin, Texas, operated by Loyd Blankenship, who was at the time employed by SJG and moderator of the company's own BBS, "Illuminati". The Secret Service believed there was probable cause to search computers belonging to Blankenship and his employer, and a search warrant was issued on February 28.

The Secret Service executed the warrant on SJG on 1 March 1990. Three SJG computers were seized, along with over 300 floppy disks. Among these was the master copy of GURPS Cyberpunk, a role-playing game written by Blankenship which SJG was about to release. The "Illuminati" server included private personal emails to and from SJG employees. The material was returned in June 1990.

== Trial ==
SJG sued the Secret Service for damages arising from loss of revenue while the computers were in its custody. Steve Jackson and three other employees also sued for invasion of privacy, claiming the seizures were illegal under the Privacy Protection Act of 1980, Electronic Communications Privacy Act and Stored Communications Act. Loyd Blankenship was not party to the suits. The case came to trial in 1993 in the Western Texas District Court. SJG was represented by the Austin firm of George, Donaldson & Ford, while the lead counsel was Pete Kennedy. SJG won two out of the three counts and was awarded $50,000 in statutory damages and $250,000 in attorney's fees. No compensatory damages were awarded. The judge said that Steve Jackson had little involvement in SJG at the time of the raid, and the company was close to Chapter 11 bankruptcy, and that Jackson's renewed involvement in the wake of the raid had turned the company's fortunes around. The judge reprimanded the Secret Service, calling their warrant preparation "sloppy", suggesting that they needed "better education" regarding relevant statutes, and finding that they had no basis to suspect SJG of any wrongdoing. The third count dealing with interception of e-mail was upheld in October 1994 by the Fifth Circuit Court of Appeals. The Electronic Frontier Foundation was an amicus curiae at the appeal. Jackson and other Austin area activists including John Quarterman, Jon Lebkowsky, Bruce Sterling, Smoot Carl-Mitchell, Lar Kaufman and Matt Lawrence formed EFF-Austin in 1991.

Although the raid was not a part of Operation Sundevil, this law enforcement effort, which spanned two years, has a tarnished image owing to a lack of successful prosecutions and questionable procedures. The GURPS Cyberpunk book lists "Unsolicited Comments: The United States Secret Service" on its credits page.
