= Festering Hate =

1988 computer virus for Apple II ProDOS

Festering Hate payload

{{#parsoid

Festering Hate (also known as hate) and CyberAIDS are the names of the first two Apple II ProDOS viruses. CyberAIDS appears to have been a series of viruses with minor changes in the code, culminating in the final version called Festering Hate, which appeared in 1988 (The Festering Hate World Tour - Festering Hate in '88). When the virus went off, the title page credited "Rancid Grapefruit" and "Cereal Killer" of the "Kool/Rad Alliance!"

The phone number embedded in the detonation page was apparently the home number of John Maxfield (also known as "Cable Pair") a well-known FBI informant and private investigator of the era, whose specialty was computer crime and hackers.

Unlike the few Apple viruses that had come before, such as the Elk Cloner virus, that were essentially annoying but did no damage, the Festering Hate series of viruses was extremely destructive, spreading to all system files it could find on the host computer (hard drive, floppy and system memory) and then destroying everything when it could no longer find any uninfected files.

== CyberAIDS ==
Although there are references and message threads about CyberAIDS appearing on Usenet as early as 1985 and 1986, CyberAIDS seems to have attained critical mass in 1987 when it finally spread out of the pirate underground, where the payload was originally attached to cracked software, and hit the mainstream networks of the time and began affecting legitimate users.

== Festering Hate ==
Festering Hate was the last iteration of the CyberAIDS code-base and seems to have bridged the virus from underground pirate BBS systems to the mainstream, by way of a shareware telecommunications application called Zlink. In fact, the original impression was that Zlink itself was nothing but a Trojan horse that delivered a viral payload.

During the spread of CyberAIDS, there were apparently a variety of Apple II programmers of the time who wrote virus detection software and sold it to protect people from Apple ProDOS viruses. Since the only viruses that existed at the time (and the only viruses that such programs would detect) were CyberAIDS and Festering Hate, the "Kool/Rad Alliance" appears to have released the final version of the code-base to include a sarcastic taunt directed at Glen Bredon, one of the programmers who was selling anti-virus software.

The last strain of the CyberAIDS/Festering Hate variants appears to have been released in 1988 and was fixed by Morgan Davis, who put an end to feud between the "Kool/Rad Alliance" and the writers of anti-virus software by releasing VirusMD for free. Even so, within months VirusMD became a commercial product. By this point the authors of the CyberAIDS and Festering Hate code-base appear to have lost interest in their virus and the Apple II platform itself.

== Legacy ==
A description of the behaviour of CyberAIDS was published in the Summer 1988 issue of 2600 Magazine, by The Plague of MOD. The source code is not known to be available. The article that appeared in 2600 was interesting for a variety of reasons. In addition to publishing a de facto "how to" guide for potential virus writers, "The Plague" showed a remarkable understanding of the damage he caused, while demonstrating no remorse for his actions and perhaps inadvertently disclosing some of the behind-the-scenes information regarding the pseudonyms of people involved, namely the LOD members Lord Digital (a.k.a. Cereal Killer) and Dead Lord (a.k.a. Rancid Grapefruit), who later launched MindVox. There are "easter eggs" scattered throughout a variety of that era's documents and files, seeing their last appearance in MindVox-era texts, and Patrick Kroupa's parody of William Gibson's Agrippa. References to the virus appear very openly in mainstream media pieces about Kroupa and Fancher.

The last traces of recognition for Cereal Killer and The Plague appear in Rafael Moreu's 1995 film, Hackers. The credits for the movie include former LOD member Dave Buchwald and 2600 Magazine publisher Eric Corley. Additionally, IMDb lists Nicholas Jarecki and Bruce Fancher as uncredited consultants, who apparently wanted their names removed from the film after seeing the direction it was taking. While The Plague's 1988 article made it relatively obvious that Lord Digital was Cereal Killer, and Dead Lord was Rancid Grapefruit, the real identity of The Plague himself remains unknown.
