= Agrippa (A Book of the Dead) =

Book by William Gibson

- Author: William Gibson
- Cover artist: Dennis Ashbaugh
- Subject: Memory
- Genre: Poetry
- Publisher: Kevin Begos Jr.
- Publication date: 1992
- Media type: Artist's book
- OCLC: 48079355

Agrippa (A Book of the Dead) is a work of art created by science fiction novelist William Gibson, artist Dennis Ashbaugh and publisher Kevin Begos Jr. in 1992. The work consists of a 300-line semi-autobiographical electronic poem by Gibson, embedded in an artist's book by Ashbaugh. Gibson's text focused on the ethereal, human-owed nature of memories retained over the passage of time (the title referred to a Kodak photo album from which the text's memories are taken). Its principal notoriety arose from the fact that the poem, stored on a 3.5" floppy disk, was programmed to encrypt itself after a single use; similarly, the pages of the artist's book were treated with photosensitive chemicals, effecting the gradual fading of the words and images from the book's first exposure to light. The work is recognised as an early example of electronic literature.

== Origin and concept ==
The impetus for the initiation of the project was Kevin Begos Jr., a publisher of museum-quality manuscripts motivated by disregard for the commercialism of the art world, who suggested to abstract painter Dennis Ashbaugh that they "put out an art book on computer that vanishes". Ashbaugh—who despite his "heavy art-world resume" was bored with the abstract impressionist paintings he was doing—took the suggestion seriously, and developed it further.

A few years beforehand, Ashbaugh had written a fan letter to cyberpunk novelist William Gibson, whose oeuvre he had admired, and the pair had struck up a telephone friendship. Shortly after the project had germinated in the minds of Begos and Ashbaugh, they contacted and recruited Gibson. The project exemplified Gibson's deep ambivalence towards technologically advanced futurity, and as The New York Times expressed it, was "designed to challenge conventional notions about books and art while extracting money from collectors of both".

Some people have said that they think this is a scam or pure hype … [m]aybe fun, maybe interesting, but still a scam. But Gibson thinks of it as becoming a memory, which he believes is more real than anything you can actually see.

— Kevin Begos Jr., End Notes,

The project manifested as a poem written by Gibson incorporated into an artist's book created by Ashbaugh; as such it was as much a work of collaborative conceptual art as poetry. Gibson stated that Ashbaugh's design "eventually included a supposedly self-devouring floppy-disk intended to display the text only once, then eat itself."

Ashbaugh was gleeful at the dilemma this would pose to librarians: in order to register the copyright of the book, he had to send two copies to the United States Library of Congress, who, in order to classify it had to read it, and in the process, necessarily had to destroy it. The creators had initially intended to infect the disks with a computer virus, but declined to after considering the potential damage to the computer systems of innocents.

== Release and replication ==
Okay, sit down and pay attention. We're only going to say this once.

— William Gibson, National Public Radio, December 9, 1992.

The work was premiered on December 9, 1992, at The Kitchen, an art space in Chelsea in New York City. The performance—known as "The Transmission"—consisted of the public reading of the poem by composer and musician Robert Ashley, recorded and simultaneously transmitted to several other cities. The poem was inscribed on a sculptural magnetic disk which had been vacuum-sealed until the event's commencement, and was reportedly (although not actually) programmed to erase itself upon exposure to air. Contrary to numerous colourful reports, neither this disk nor the diskettes embedded in the artist's book were ever actually hacked in any strict sense.

Academic researcher Matthew Kirschenbaum has reported that a pirated text of the poem was released the next day on MindVox, "an edgy New York City-based electronic bulletin board". Kirschenbaum considers Mindvox, an interface between the dark web and the global Internet, to have been "an ideal initial host". The text spread rapidly from that point on, first on FTP servers and anonymous mailers and later via USENET and listserv email. Since Gibson did not use email at the time, fans sent copies of the pirated text to his fax machine.

The precise manner in which the text was obtained for MindVox is unclear, although the initial custodian of the text, known only as "Templar" attached to it an introductory note in which he claimed credit. Begos claimed that a troupe of New York University students representing themselves as documentarians attended The Transmission and made a videotape recording of the screen as it displayed the text as an accompaniment of Gibson's friend and stage magician Penn Jillette's reading. Kirschenbaum speculates that this group included the offline persona of Templar or one of his associates. According to this account, ostensibly endorsed by Templar in a post to Slashdot in February 2000, the students then transcribed the poem from the tape and within hours had uploaded it to MindVox. However, according to a dissenting account by hacktivist and MindVox co-founder Patrick K. Kroupa, subterfuge prior to The Transmission elicited a betrayal of trust which yielded the uploaders the text. Kirschenbaum declined to elaborate on the specifics of the Kroupa conjecture, which he declared himself "not at liberty to disclose".

Agrippa owes its transmission and continuing availability to a complex network of individuals, communities, ideologies, markets, technologies, and motives. Only in the most heroic reading of the events … is Agrippa saved for posterity solely by virtue of the knight Templar. … Today, the 404 File Not Found messages that Web browsing readers of Agrippa inevitably encounter … are more than just false leads; they are latent affirmations of the work's original act of erasure that allow the text to stage anew all of its essential points about artifacts, memory, and technology. "Because the struggle for the text is the text."

— Kirschenbaum, Matthew G., "Hacking 'Agrippa': The Source of the Online Text", The Agrippa Files.

On December 9, 2008 (the sixteenth anniversary of the original Transmission), "The Agrippa Files", working with a scholarly team at the University of Maryland, released an emulated run of the entire poem (derived from an original diskette loaned by a collector) and an hour's worth of "bootleg" footage shot covertly at the Americas Society (the source of the text that was posted on MindVox).

=== Cryptography ===
Since its debut in 1992, the mystery of Agrippa remained hidden for 20 years. Although many had tried to hack the code and decrypt the program, the uncompiled source code was lost long ago. Alan Liu and his team at "The Agrippa Files" created an extensive website with tools and resources to crack the Agrippa Code. They collaborated with Matthew Kirschenbaum at the Maryland Institute for Technology in the Humanities and the Digital Forensics Lab, and Quinn DuPont, a PhD student of cryptography from the University of Toronto, in calling for the aid of cryptographers to figure out how the program works by creating "Cracking the Agrippa Code: The Challenge", which enlisted participants to solve the intentional scrambling of the poem in exchange for prizes. The code was successfully cracked by Robert Xiao in late July 2012.

There is no encryption algorithm present in the Agrippa binary; consequently, the visual encryption effect that displays when the poem has finished is a ruse. The visual effect is the result of running the decrypted ciphertext (in memory) through the re-purposed bit-scrambling decryption algorithm, and then abandoning the text in memory. Only the fake genetic code is written back to disk.

The encryption resembles the RSA algorithm. This algorithm encodes data in 3-byte blocks. First, each byte is permuted through an 8-position permutation, then the bits are split into two 12-bit integers (by taking the low 4 bits of the second byte and the 8 bits of the first byte as the first 12-bit integer, and the 8 bits of the third byte and the 4 high bits of the second integer as the second 12-bit integer). Each is individually encrypted by taking them to the 3491st power, mod 4097; the bits are then reassembled into 3 bytes. The encrypted text is then stored in a string variable as part of the program. To shroud the would-be visible and noticeable text it is compressed with the simple Lzw before final storage. As the Macintosh Common Lisp compiler compresses the main program code into the executable, this was not that necessary.

In order to prevent a second running of the program it corrupts itself when run. The program simply overwrites itself with a 6000 byte long DNA-like code at a certain position. Archival documents suggest that the original plan was to use a series of ASCII 1's to corrupt the binary, but at some point in development a change was made to use fake genetic code, in keeping with the visual motifs in the book. The genetic code has a codon entropy of 5.97 bits/codon, much higher than any natural DNA sequence known. However, the ciphertext was not overwritten.

==== Weakness ====
- A memory dump of Mini vMac can be obtained with Linux ckpt or a similar tool after the Agrippa program has been loaded. The executable code could be reverse engineered.
- The encryption itself due to the block cipher exhibited a regular pattern due to repeated text in the original plaintext.
- The LZW compression itself does not hide the letter frequencies.
- The scramble display has exactly the same letter frequencies as the underlying plaintext.

== Content and editions ==
Agrippa comes in a rough-hewn black box adorned with a blinking green light and an LCD readout that flickers with an endless stream of decoded DNA. The top opens like a laptop computer, revealing a hologram of a circuit board. Inside is a battered volume, the pages of which are antique rag-paper, bound and singed by hand.

— Gavin Edwards, Details, June 1992.

The book was published in 1992 in two limited editions—Deluxe and Small—by Kevin Begos Jr. Publishing, New York City. The deluxe edition came in a 16 by 21½-inch (41 cm × 55 cm) metal mesh case sheathed in Kevlar (a polymer used to make bulletproof vests) and designed to look like a buried relic. Inside is a book of 93 ragged and charred pages sewn by hand and bound in stained and singed linen by Karl Foulkes; the book gives the impression of having survived a fire; it was described by Peter Schwenger as "a black box recovered from some unspecified disaster." The edition includes pages of DNA sequences set in double columns of 42 lines each like the Gutenberg Bible, and copperplate aquatint etchings by Ashbaugh editioned by Peter Pettingill on Fabriano Tiepolo paper. The monochromatic etchings depict stylised chromosomes, a hallmark of Ashbaugh's work, accompanied by imagery of a pistol, camera or in some instances simple line drawings—all allusions to Gibson's contribution.

The deluxe edition was set in Monotype Gill Sans at Golgonooza Letter Foundry, and printed on Rives heavyweight text by Begos and the Sun Hill Press. The final 60 pages of the book were then fused together, with a hollowed-out section cut into the centre, containing the self-erasing diskette on which the text of Gibson's poem was encrypted. The encryption was the work of a pseudonymous computer programmer, "BRASH", assisted by Electronic Frontier Foundation founders John Perry Barlow and John Gilmore. The deluxe edition was originally priced at US$1500 (later $2000), and each copy is unique to some degree because of handmade or hand-finished elements.

The small edition was sold for $450; like the deluxe edition, it was set in Monotype Gill Sans, but in single columns. It was printed on Mohawk Superfine text by the Sun Hill Press, with the reproduction of the etchings printed on a Canon laser printer. The edition was then Smythe sewn at Spectrum Bindery and enclosed in a solander box. A bronze-boxed collectors' copy was also released, and retailed at $7,500.

Fewer than 95 deluxe editions of Agrippa are extant, although the exact number is unknown and is the source of considerable mystery. The Victoria and Albert Museum possesses a deluxe edition, numbered 4 of 10. A publicly accessible copy of the deluxe edition is available at the Rare Books Division of the New York Public Library and a small copy resides at Western Michigan University in Kalamazoo, Michigan, while the Frances Mulhall Achilles Library at the Whitney Museum of American Art in New York City hosts a promotional prospectus. The Victoria and Albert Museum's copy was first exhibited in a display entitled The Book and Beyond, held in the Museum's 20th Century Gallery from April to October 1995. The same copy was subsequently also included in a V&A exhibition entitled Digital Pioneers, from 2009 to 2010. Both V&A shows were curated by Douglas Dodds. Another copy of the book was exhibited in the 2003–2004 exhibition Ninety from the Nineties at the New York Public Library. Gibson at one point claimed never to have seen a copy of the printed book, spurring speculation that no copies had actually been made. Many copies have since been documented, and Gibson's signature was noted on copies held by the New York Public Library and the V&A. In 2011, the Bodleian Library's Special Collections Department at the University of Oxford acquired Kevin Begos' copy of Agrippa, as well as the archive of Begos' papers related to the work.

== Poem ==
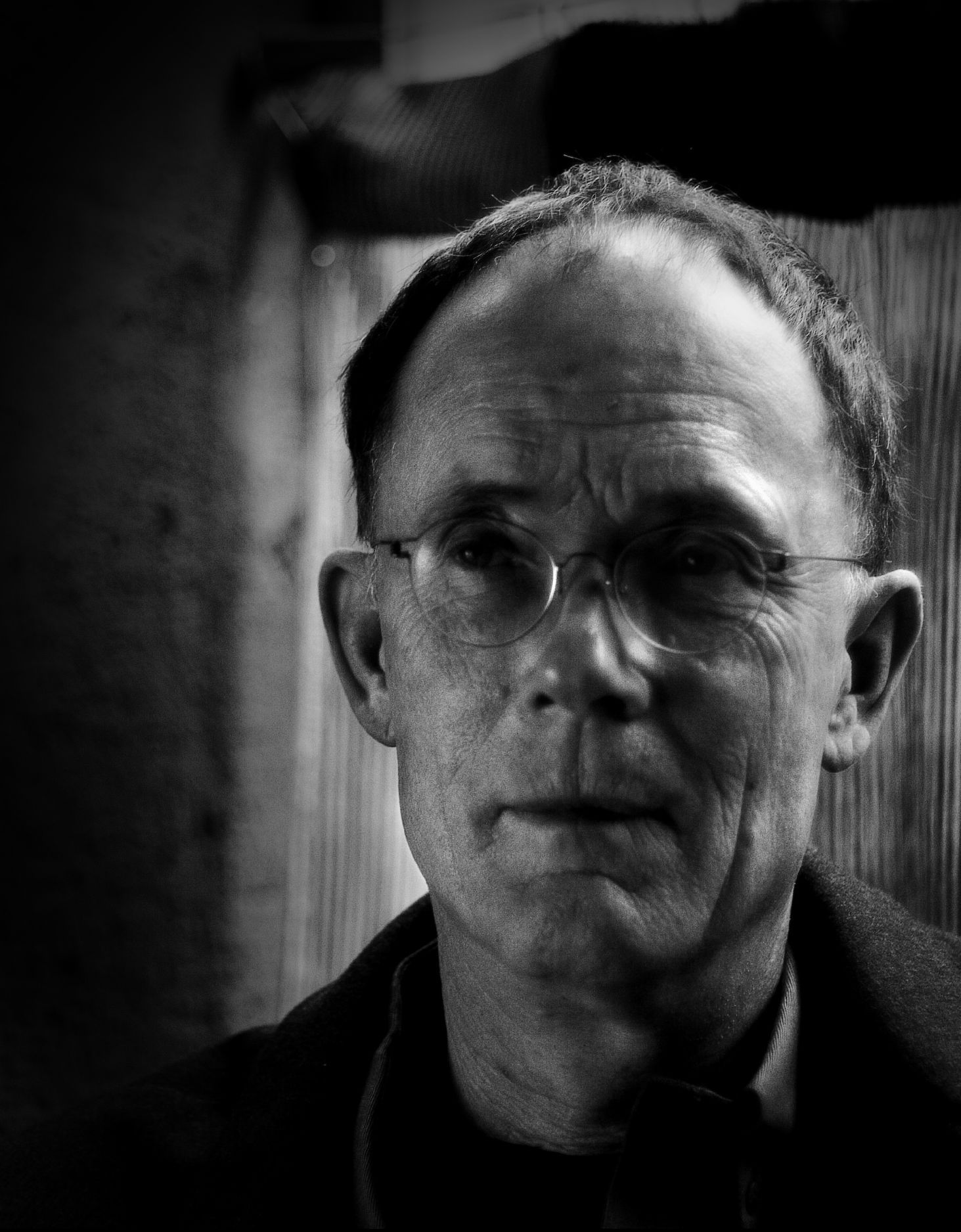
William Gibson, author of the Agrippa poem, pictured in Paris on his 60th birthday, March 17, 2008.

The construction of the book and the subject matter of the poem within it share a metaphorical connection in the decay of memory. In this light, critic Peter Schwenger asserts that Agrippa can be understood as organized by two ideas: the death of Gibson's father, and the disappearance or absence of the book itself. In this sense, it instantiates the ephemeral nature of all text.

=== Theme and form ===
The poem is a detailed description of several objects, including a photo album and the camera that took the pictures in it, and is essentially about the nostalgia that the speaker, presumably Gibson himself, feels towards the details of his family's history: the painstaking descriptions of the houses they lived in, the cars they drove, and even their pets.

It starts around 1919 and moves up to today, or possibly beyond. If it works, it makes the reader uncomfortably aware of how much we tend to accept the contemporary media version of the past. You can see it in Westerns, the way the 'mise-en-scene' and the collars on cowboys change through time. It's never really the past; it's always a version of your own time.

— Gibson, as quoted in Details, June 1992.

In its original form, the text of the poem was supposed to fade from the page and, in Gibson's own words, "eat itself" off of the diskette enclosed with the book. The reader would, then, be left with only the memory of the text, much like the speaker is left with only the memory of his home town and his family after moving to Canada from South Carolina, in the course of the poem (as Gibson himself did during the Vietnam War).

=== "The mechanism" ===
The poem contains a motif of "the mechanism", described as "Forever / Dividing that from this", and which can take the form of the camera or of the ancient gun that misfires in the speaker's hands. Technology, "the mechanism", is the agent of memory, which transforms subjective experience into allegedly objective records (photography). It is also the agent of life and death, one moment dispensing lethal bullets, but also likened to the life-giving qualities of sex. Shooting the gun is "[l]ike the first time you put your mouth / on a woman".

The poem is, then, not merely about memory, but how memories are formed from subjective experience, and how those memories compare to mechanically reproduced recordings. In the poem, "the mechanism" is strongly associated with recording, which can replace subjective experience.

Insomuch as memories constitute our identities, "the mechanism" thus represents the destruction of the self via recordings. Hence both cameras, as devices of recording, and guns, as instruments of destruction, are part of the same mechanism—dividing that (memory, identity, life) from this (recordings, anonymity, death).

== Critical reception and influence ==
Agrippa was extremely influential—as a sigil for the artistic community to appreciate the potential of electronic media—for the extent to which it entered public consciousness. It caused a fierce controversy in the art world, among museums and among libraries. It challenged established notions of permanence of art and literature, and, as Ashbaugh intended, raised significant problems for archivists seeking to preserve it for the benefit of future generations. Agrippa was also used as the key of a book cipher in the Cicada 3301 mystery.

Agrippa was particularly well received by critics, with digital media theorist Peter Lunenfeld describing it in 2001 as "one of the most evocative hypertexts published in the 1990s". Professor of English literature John Johnson has claimed that the importance of Agrippa stems not only from its "foregrounding of mediality in an assemblage of texts", but also from the fact that "media in this work are explicitly as passageways to the realm of the dead". English Professor Raymond Malewitz argues that "the poem's stanzas form a metaphorical DNA fingerprint that reveals Gibson's life to be, paradoxically, a novel repetition of his father's and grandfather's lives." The Cambridge History of Twentieth-Century English Literature, which described the poem as "a mournful text", praised Agrippa's inventive use of digital format. However, academic Joseph Tabbi remarked in a 2008 paper that Agrippa was among those works that are "canonized before they have been read, resisted, and reconsidered among fellow authors within an institutional environment that persists in time and finds outlets in many media".

In a lecture at the exhibition of Agrippa at the Center for Book Arts in New York City, semiotician Marshall Blonsky of New York University drew an allusion between the project and the work of two French literary figures—philosopher Maurice Blanchot (author of "The Absence of the Book"), and poet Stéphane Mallarmé, a 19th-century forerunner of semiotics and deconstruction. In response to Blonsky's analysis that "[t]he collaborators in Agrippa are responding to a historical condition of language, a modern skepticism about it", Gibson disparagingly commented "Honest to God, these academics who think it's all some sort of big-time French philosophy—that's a scam. Those guys worship Jerry Lewis, they get our pop culture all wrong."

== See also ==
- Cicada 3301, an online puzzle which utilised the poem
- Inherent vice, the inevitable deterioration of physical objects
- Love Is in the Bin, a Banksy artwork created with similar intentional deterioration

== Footnotes ==
=== References ===
- Ashbaugh, Dennis; Gibson, William (Winter 1993). "Dennis Ashbaugh and William Gibson". Art Journal. 52 (4). College Art Association: 79. doi:10.2307/777636. JSTOR 777636.
- Marcus, Laura (2004). The Cambridge History of Twentieth-Century English Literature. Cambridge: Cambridge University Press. ISBN 978-0-521-82077-6.
- Berti, Agustín (2015). From Digital to Analog : Agrippa and Other Hybrids in the Beginnings of Digital Culture. New York, NY: Peter Lang Publishing, Inc. ISBN 9781433125058.
