= Dan Carr (poet) =

American poet and politician (1951–2012)

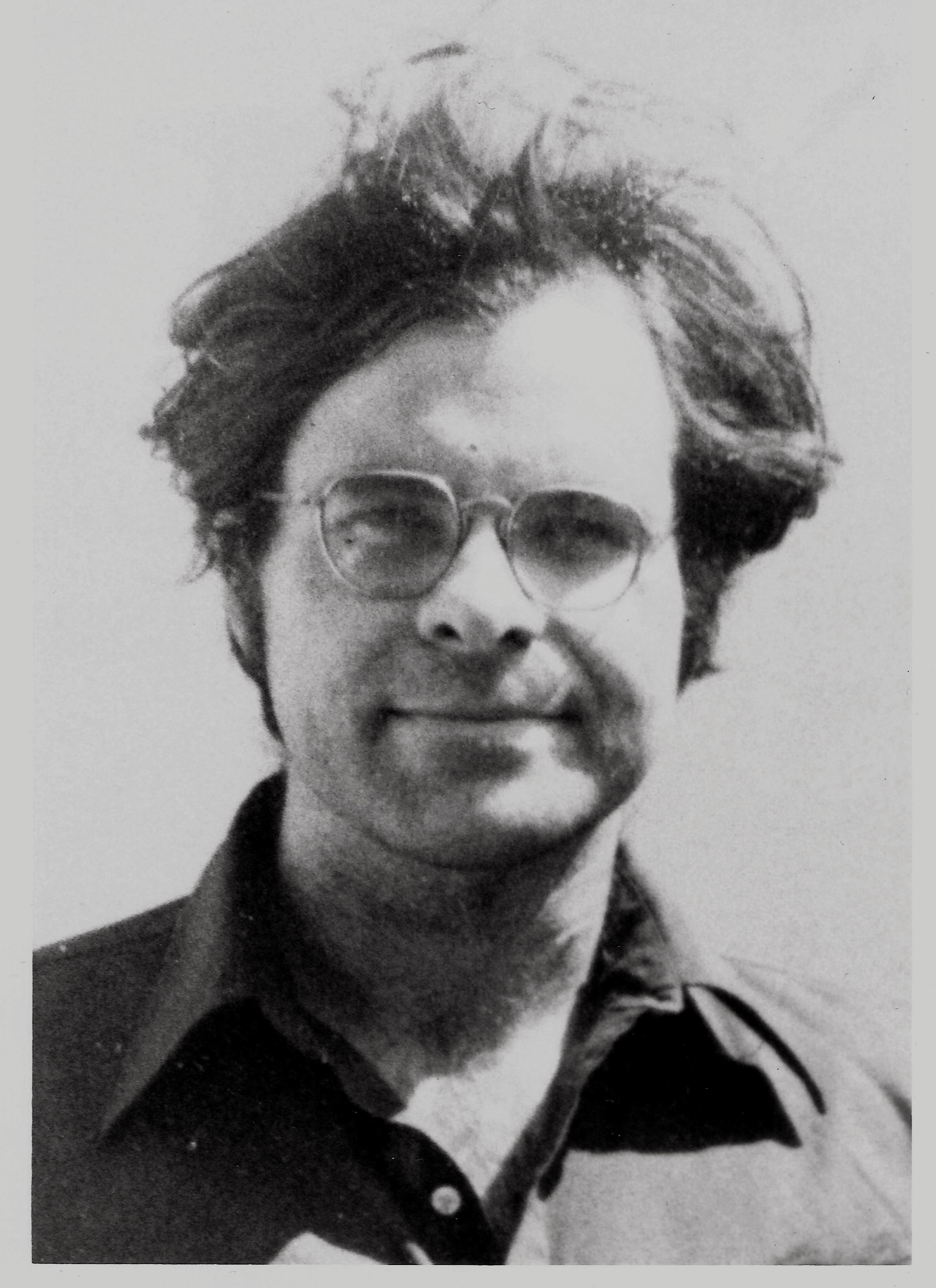

Dan Carr (August 24, 1951 – June 26, 2012) was an American poet, type designer, typographer, printer, teacher, punchcutter, environmentalist, human rights activist and New Hampshire State Representative. He co-founded Golgonooza Letter Foundry & Press* (listed among the resources in Elements of Typographic Style), Trois Fontaines,* Four Zoas Night House** and was an editor for the Four Zoas Press, all literary presses.

*(with co-founder J. Ferrari), ** (with J. Ferrari and M.Olsen)

== Typography and punchcutting ==
He designed four type faces, two for letterpress which he hand cut in the traditional manner: Regulus and Parmenides, and three digital typefaces: Cheneau, Lyons, and Philosophie. Parmenides was commissioned for Robert Bringhurst's book of the same name. Carr received a Maitre Graveur Typographe (Master of Punchcutting) from the Cabinet des Poincons et des Livres, de L’impremerie nationale (Imprimierie Nationale) in Paris, for Regulus in 1998.

Carr's archaic Greek type face called Parmenides was awarded by bukva:raz!, an international competition of type design, sponsored by the Association Typographique Internationale (ATypI). Carr also received an award from the Type Directors Club Type Design Competition for his Cheneau typeface (judging took place at the School of Visual Arts in New York City, in 2000).

== Life ==
Born in Cranston, Rhode Island, August 24, 1951, Carr studied English Literature and received his BA at Clark University in Worcester, Massachusetts. He sudied with and eventually partnered with poet S. R. Lavin. The Four Zoas Press was co-founded by Lavin and Carr; together, they printed The Four Zoas Journal of Poetry and Letters, which published work by Gerard Malanga, George Oppen, Willam S. Burroughs, and Carr and Lavin, among many others. Carr and Lavin were awarded N.E.A. funding to support small press publications on many occasions between 1972 and 1982. Carr started Four Zoas Night House, Ltd. after leaving Ware, MA and moving to Boston. In Boston, Massachusetts, in 1979, he and his partner Julia Ferrari started the Golgonooza Letter Foundry & Press, a hot metal monotype graphic design and composition house, which they moved to Ashuelot, New Hampshire, in 1982. Together they created Trois Fontaines Press in 1997, a limited edition fine press. Carr taught typography, and the history of typography at Keene State University in Keene, New Hampshire, as well as giving workshops on punchcutting and letterpress printing internationally.

Carr became politically active during the Howard Dean campaign of 2004. Carr was elected to the New Hampshire House of Representatives in 2008. In his first term he successfully sponsored legislation to form a NH Commission on Native American Affairs. He served two 2-year terms in the New Hampshire House.

== Works ==
=== Typefaces ===
- Regulus (metal) – Maitre Graveur Typographe 1998
- Cheneau (digital) – Judge's Choice ATypI 2000
- Lyons (digital)
- Philosophie (digital)
- Parmenides (metal) – bukva:raz! 2001

=== Poetry books ===
- Reach of the Heart – 2008
- Gifts of the Leaves – 1997
- Intersection – 1989
- The Dream Animal – 1988
- Mysteries of the Palaces of Water – 1985
- The Ennead of Set Heru – 1983
- Transmissions of the Mist – 1979
- Antedeluvian Dream Songs – 1978
- Notice the Star – 1976
- Living in Fear – 1975
- Li Po’s Sandalwood Boat – 1975

=== Broadsides ===
- Peace – 2002
- Three Seals – 2001
- When Grasses Leave No Trace – 1999
- Love is Time – 1989
- Land of the Double Crown – 1978
- The Inlet Waters – 1978

=== Translations ===
- Shan Zhong Wen Da (In the Mountains) Li Bai. (chapbook) – 2002
- Questions and Answers Among the Mountains (broadside display of book design) – 2003

=== Editorial ===
==== The Four Zoas Journal of Poetry and Letters ====
- No. 3 too insane
- No. 4 Divine in the void
- No. 5 Torture to the Torturers
- No. 6 Revolt of the Angels
- No. 7 Still Détente
- No. 8 Mythologies

=== Articles ===
- Making a Visible Spirit: Cutting the Regulus punches – Matrix 16 (1996)
- Rewriting History? Observations on the Centenary of The Monotype Recorder – Matrix 18 (1998)
- Typographic Sculpture: the Survival of Punchcutting at the Imprimerie Nationale – Matrix 20(2000)
- Cutting Parmenides – Matrix 22 (2002)
- Casting Chinese Type – Matrix 23 (2003)
- The Kuco, a Complete Typecasting and Finishing Machine – Matrix 27 (2007)
