= Bruce Fancher =

American hacker

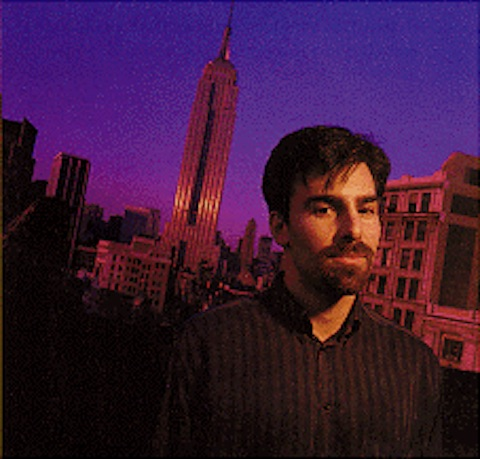
Bruce Fancher on Manhattan Rooftop in 1993

Bruce Fancher (also known as Timberwolf) (born April 13, 1971) is a former computer hacker and member of the Legion of Doom hacker group. He co-founded MindVox in 1991 with Patrick K. Kroupa.

== Early years ==
Bruce Fancher grew up in New York City. He is the son of Ed Fancher, who founded The Village Voice with Dan Wolf and Norman Mailer, in 1955.

Fancher attended YIPL/TAP meetings that were taking place on the Lower East Side of New York City. Fancher's peers included several hackers and phone phreaks of the day.

The hacker publication Phrack is filled with out-of-character rants at Fancher's work. Around the time MindVox was first launched, with Phrack's only humor issue (Phrack #36), also called "Diet Phrack". Phrack 36 included the first and last, official publication of an article co-written by Fancher and Patrick Kroupa, called "Elite Access", which was a cynical and funny expose of the "elite" and private hacker underground of the day. The article was apparently worked on and edited during a 5-year period, and there are at least 3 different versions of it that still remain online, including a much earlier, hardcore technical revision which has most of the commands to control phone company computers, deleted out of it.

Fancher and Kroupa's "games" with the "elite" made it into Kroupa's "Agr1ppa", a parody of William Gibson's Agrippa, which had been leaked to the world from MindVox. The opening verses include a letter dated 1985, from the SysOp (System Operator) of a pirate Bulletin Board System which had apparently thrown both Fancher and Kroupa off the system, for uploading cracked software, which they then infected with a virus.

Although MindVox quickly became notorious for the escapades of its hard-partying clientele, there is little or no evidence that Fancher was involved personally in the wild lifestyles of its members. However, he was at least indirectly affected, in that by 1995 Kroupa's drug use was fast becoming legendary and his ability to function on a daily basis was diminishing. While the media attention never ended, the development and growth of the system had slowed down and Phantom Access Technologies was taking on consulting positions to help other companies create their own online presence, and Fancher gained growing acclaim as a software architect and member of the dot.com technocracy.

There are perpetual signs of MindVox coming back to life and opening again, it appears likely that MindVox either went dark, or shut off public access, at some time in late 1997. The two main publications which covered the shutting of the gates, were The New York Times and Wired, who were apparently unable to arrive at a consensus, with the Times listing the sale of MindVox's client-base and the closing of the system, in 1996. Wired was still covering an apparently open and at least partially operational MindVox circa 1997, more than one year after the Times listed MindVox as being closed.

By the late 1990s, Fancher was involved in a series of start-ups where he founded and started companies and then sold after a few years. The best-known of these appears to be DuoCash, a micropayments company made infamous through a series of photographs posted on MindVox, taken from the DuoCash office building, located across the street from where the World Trade Center had stood a few days before.

== Media ==
=== Books ===
- Rudy Rucker & R. U. Sirius, (1992) User's Guide to the New Edge (ISBN 0-06-096928-8)
- Bruce Sterling, (1993) The Hacker Crackdown : Law And Disorder On The Electronic Frontier (ISBN 0-553-56370-X)
- J C Herz, (1995) Surfing on the Internet (ISBN 0-316-36009-0)
- St. Jude (Jude Milhon), (1995) The Real Cyberpunk Fakebook (ISBN 0-679-76230-2)
- Charles Platt, (1997) Anarchy Online (ISBN 0-06-100990-3)
- Melanie McGrath, (1998) Hard, Soft & Wet (ISBN 0-00-654849-0)
- Stacy Horn, (2002) Waiting for My Cats to Die : A Memoir (ISBN 0-312-28744-5)

=== Magazines & Newspapers ===
- Forbes, William Flanagan (1992), The Playground Bullies Have Learned to Type
- Mondo 2000, Andrew Hawkins (1992), There's A Party in my Mind... MindVox!
- The New Yorker (1993), CyberHero
- Associated Press, Frank Bajak (1993), Wiring the Planet: MindVox!
- Wired Magazine, Charles Platt (November 1993), MindVox: Urban Attitude Online
- Sassy Magazine, Margie Ingall (1993), Hi Girlz, See You in Cyberspace!
- New York Magazine, Jeff Goodell (1994), Boot Up and See Me Sometime
- Business Week, Amy Cortese (1995), Warding Off the Cyberspace Invaders
- Reuters, Therese Poletti (1995), Hollywood gets into Cyberspace
- Los Angeles Times, Steve G. Steinberg (1997), Ex-Hacker Ready for Next Step
- Forbes, Adam L. Penenberg (1997), Hacking the Corporate Ladder
- Point of View (POV), Tim Barkow (1998), Turn On, Hack In, Cash Out
- The New York Times, John Schwartz (2001), New Economy: Even in Downturn, Sex Still Sells

=== Film ===
- Jason Scott Sadofsky (2005) BBS: The Documentary.

=== Television ===
- CNN (1997). Panel Discussion on The Communications Decency Act (CDA)

=== Music ===
- Billy Idol (1993) Cyberpunk, EMI

== See also ==
- MindVox
- Patrick Kroupa
- Legion of Doom
