= Phantom Access =

Series of hacking programs for Apple II

Phantom Access 5.7K title page, featuring a confused TIE fighter in front of a Death Star and the post-divestiture AT&T "death star" logo.

Phantom Access was the name given to a series of hacking programs written by Patrick Kroupa (a.k.a., Lord Digital) of LOD. The programs were worked on during the early to mid-1980s (1982–1986), and designed to run on the Apple II computer and Apple-Cat modem.

== History ==
There are a variety of references to the Phantom Access programs in texts from underground bulletin board systems from the 1980s. Reading the files and messages, it appears that the Phantom Access name was a given to an entire series of programs coded by Lord Digital and apparently for internal LOD use, because the programs were not distributed to the "public" or even most other members of the hacker underground of the time.

Much like Festering Hate, there are references to the programs in a variety of mainstream press articles of the early and mid 90s when MindVox first came online. Phantom Access is also where the parent company that launched MindVox, Phantom Access Technologies, took its name from.

== Program Content ==
Despite obviously being made for internal (rather than public/commercial) release, Phantom Access contains many of the qualities that would be more expected of a commercial release. The use of graphics (including animation), utility programs, extensive formatted documentation and sample "sub-modules" which contain instructions for the Phantom Access program itself is unusual for a program of this kind at this time due to the amount of work involved in setting up those elements when the expectation would be that the limited user-base would be able to manage without them. In addition to the functional aspects of the program there was also bundled easter egg type media such as random poems, and Pink Floyd lyrics.

== Phantom Access 5.7K ==
The Phantom Access disks that were leaked, contained one full Apple II disk side of software and an additional disk of documentation written about the programs. There is another text archive of messages from the era that were apparently posted when Phantom Access was leaked to The Underground BBS in the late 80s.

The programs come on a disk formatted with ZDOS (Zilog DOS), a common operating system used with a Z80 co-processor add-on to the Apple II. Messages from the era indicate that the Phantom Access leak may contain a virus, and taking into account Festering Hate, it is certainly possible.

=^=^=^=^=^=^=^=^=^=^=^=^=^=^=^=^=^=^=^=
%   )=-> PHANTOM ACCESS [5.7K] <-=(   %
=/%/%/%/%/%/%/%/%/%/%/%/%/%/%/%/%/%/%/=
%  (C)opyright 1982-86, Lord Digital  %
=^=^=^=^=^=^=^=^=^=^=^=^=^=^=^=^=^=^=^=
           (Sub-Module Loaded)
/:::::::::::::::::::::::::::::::::::::\
:                                     :
: [Code File]:[Filename For Save]     :
: [Now Testing Code]:[012345]         :
: [Total Codes Scanned]:[1234]        :
: [Valid Codes Scanned]:[99]          :
: [Last Valid Code]:[012345]          :
:                                     :
-:::::::::::[System Status]:::::::::::-
:                                     :
: [SND][PHN][PCN][OCC][RNG][---][SEQ] :
: [%][  Current Function Active  ][%] :
:             [Block]:[-]             :
:      [Audio Duration]:[00]:000      :
:    [Time Left In Audio Test]:[-]    :
:.....................................:
\Type [ESC] to Exit After Current Code/

Phantom Access itself appears to be a highly-programmable common interface, which follows instructions contained in a variety of files. At the topmost level it seems to be a toolkit for utilizing all the special functions of the Apple-Cat modem, it scans systems, hacks codes, functions as a blue box, and exports the results into a series of files which can be manipulated using all the other programs in the series.

A quote from the Phantom Access Documentation:

Phantom Access 5.7K is the hacker itself. It could be described as the final processing unit of the instruction sets, but without the utilities it would be useless to the end user, as that is ALL it is. Sub-Modules must already exist prior to usage. This was a necessary compromise, as there is NO memory left on a 64K system once the Slider's and Rotation system are activated.

It uses EXEC files as a form of primitive scripting for the Apple II. Reading through the messages of the era, the scripts are doing direct writes to various registers and parts of memory using the POKE command. The programs regularly check memory to see what is running or loaded and generally seem to take over control of the computer.

== Final Evolution ==
Lacking an Apple II computer and Apple-Cat modem, in addition to their historical value, perhaps the most useful and interesting part of the Phantom Access programs is the extensive documentation Kroupa wrote. In addition to explaining how to program the sub-modules, the documents provide an extensive overview of phreaking information, information about the other programs in the Phantom Access series (which appear to have been other system penetration tools and rootkits, before the term "rootkit" existed), and the eventual goal of the whole series, which seems to have been turning the entire Apple II computer and Apple-Cat modem into a programmable phreaking box, which could be plugged into the computers Kroupa and other LOD members were abandoning the Apple platform and switching over to (NeXT, Sun and SGI hardware).

From the Phantom Access documentation:

The eventual goal of Phantom Access was to realize a fully automated system for the Apple-Cat modem. The sound sampling and evaluation system has been almost unchanged from revision 4.0 to 5.7 of the series, everything else has been rewritten several times. The final 6.6 revision is a full implementation of the original design (read: it has very little in common with anything in the 5.7 series) with a final processor that is capable of passing data through the Apple-Cat's serial port to an external machine, thus allowing use of the entire Apple computer system as nothing more than a very sophisticated auxiliary modem.

Towards the late 80s, it looks like Kroupa and LOD had exactly one use left for the Apple II: to utilize the entire computer as a host for the Apple-Cat modem. This makes a very strong statement about how highly valued Novation's, Apple-Cat modem was amongst phone phreaks.

This was my solution to working within the Apple's limits. No other modem comes close to having the Apple-Cat's capabilities, but the Apple itself leaves much to be desired.

== Historical Exhibit ==
Due to its nature as a product designed for a limited set of users, Phantom Access remained extremely obscure to the general public until it was featured by digital historian and film-maker, Jason Scott as the first exhibit on textfiles.com, in January 2006.
