= Ninety from the Nineties =

2003 exhibition

Ninety from the Nineties: A Decade of Printing was an exhibition held at the New York Public Library from November 7, 2003 through May 28, 2004.

Ninety from the Nineties showcased a selection of ninety books made in the 1990s that were chosen on the merit of book arts. Note that the books were not necessarily written in the 1990s; some were older texts that were used to make special books in the 1990s. And, the books were not selected on literary merit.

In a contemporary review, The New York Times described the concept of the selection like this: "books, which we are accustomed to thinking of as containers — and conveyers — of information, are placed in a context in which form is valued over content. Language is less important than the type that impresses it on the page. The paper counts for more than the story told on it. The illustrations and the binding might be the story."

The books were divided into five categories: binding, paper, type, illustration and "inspiration." The exhibition was curated by Virginia Bartow.

== Books in the exhibition ==
Following is a list of the ninety books selected and shown in the exhibition. The source for this list is the exhibition catalogue.

| Number | Section | Book title | Author | Press | Year |
|---|---|---|---|---|---|
| 1 | Binding | Bon Bon Mots | Julie Chen | | |
| 2 | Binding | Doubly Bound: A Tool Kit [and] a Tackle Box | Diane Fine and Tracy Honn | | |
| 3 | Binding | Howards and Hoovers | Indigo Som | | |
| 4 | Binding | The Innocents Abroad | Mark Twain | | |
| 5 | Binding | The True Collector | Frederic Postman and Bonnie Stone | | |
| 6 | Binding | Baucis and Philemon from Ovid's Metamorphoses | Lois Morrison | | |
| 7 | Binding | Tea: Time in Korea | Greta D. Silbey | | |
| 8 | Binding | Phantasies of a Love Thief | Bilhana | | |
| 9 | Binding | Where I Live: Environments | Jim Gelfand | | |
| 10 | Binding | The Blues and Jives of Dr. Hepcat | Alan B. Govenar | | |
| 11 | Binding | New World Saints | — | | |
| 12 | Binding | Exquisite Horse: A Printer's Corpse | — | | |
| 13 | Binding | Rush Job | — | | |
| 14 | Binding | Vorkuta Poems | Sara Karig | | |
| 15 | Binding | The Dam Domino Book | Carol Schatt | | |
| 16 | Binding | Anatomy | Alice Jones | | |
| 17 | Binding | She Pushes with Her Hands | Dale Going | | |
| 18 | Binding | Kokopelli | Terry Horrigan | | |
| 19 | Binding | Voyelles | Arthur Rimbaud | | |
| 20 | Binding | In Praise of Patterned Papers | — | | |
| 21 | Paper | Dard Hunter & Son | Dard Hunter II and Dard Hunter III | | |
| 22 | Paper | Fine Papers at the Oxford University Press | John Bidwell | | |
| 23 | Paper | Song of Changes | Adrian Frutiger | | |
| 24 | Paper | The Lady Who Liked Clean Rest Rooms | J. P. Donleavy | | |
| 25 | Paper | The Pool | Toby Olson | | |
| 26 | Type | Portraits of Presses of Fleece | — | | |
| 27 | Type | Gifts of the Leaves | Dan Carr | | |
| 28 | Type | LETTERpressworkBOOK | James Trissel | | |
| 29 | Type | A Printer's Dozen: Eleven Spreads from Unrealised Books | Sebastian Carter | | |
| 30 | Type | She Who Saw with Her Heart | Roni Gross | | |
| 31 | Type | Zapf's Civilite Disclosed | Leonard Baskin | | |
| 32 | Type | Rex Reason, elements | Simon Patterson | | |
| 33 | Type | Prove Before Laying | Johanna Drucker | | |
| 34 | Type | Bad News | Lynne Tillman | | |
| 35 | Type | Le Roi | Francois da Ros | | |
| 36 | Type | The Architetextures | Nathaniel Tarn | | |
| 37 | Type | Specimens of Wood Type Held at the Alembic Press | Alembic Press | | |
| 38 | Type | Ten Sonnets | John Keats | | |
| 39 | Type | Twenty-three Poems from the French of Max Jacob | Max Jacob | | |
| 40 | Type | Odes | Horace | | |
| 41 | Type | Keeping Going | Seamus Heaney | | |
| 42 | Type | Loaded References (2) | Champe Smith | | |
| 43 | Type | Ornamented Types | — | | |
| 44 | Type | Poetry through Typography | — | | |
| 45 | Type | The Officina Bodoni and the Stamperia Valdonega | Grolier Club | | |
| 46 | Type | The Old-fashioned Snow | May Sarton | | |
| 47 | Type | Lin He-jing | Pu Lin | | |
| 48 | Type | A Printer's Dozen | Philip Gallo | | |
| 49 | Type | Die Ringparabel | Gotthold Ephraim Lessing | | |
| 50 | Type | The Steadfast Tin Soldier of Joh | Ernst Braches | | |
| 51 | Type | The Six-cornered Snowflake | John Frederick Nims | | |
| 52 | Type | Acts of Devotion | William Bronk | | |
| 53 | Type | Within the Walls | H. D. | | |
| 54 | Type | Late Fire, Late Snow: New and Uncollected Poems | Robert Francis | | |
| 55 | Type | Poems for the New Century | — | | |
| 56 | Type | The Valentine Elegies | Tess Gallagher | | |
| 57 | Type | Night Lake | Jean Valentine | | |
| 58 | Type | Song of the Andoumboulou: 18–20 | Nathaniel Mackey | | |
| 59 | Type | Le chevallier Tondal: Gloss Written by the Fall(en) Typography Students | — | | |
| 60 | Type | Deborah, One of the Earliest Heroic Epics | Elaine Galen | | |
| 61 | Type | The Book of Revelation | — | | |
| 62 | Illustration | Wood Engravings | June Paris | | |
| 63 | Illustration | Phisicke against Fortune | Francesco Petrarca | | |
| 64 | Illustration | Waterfalls of the Mississippi | Richard Frey Arey | | |
| 65 | Illustration | Ein Nilpferd in New York | Anke-Sophie Mey | | |
| 66 | Illustration | Towers | David Moyer | | |
| 67 | Illustration | Trout & Bass | — | | |
| 68 | Illustration | Mr. Derrick Harris, 1919–1960 | Simon Brett | | |
| 69 | Illustration | The Players and Paradigms of the Commedia Dell' Arte | Russell Maret | | |
| 70 | Illustration | North Pacific Lands & Waters | Gary Snyder | | |
| 71 | Illustration | Buddha's Bowl: A Dreamed Folktale | Alisa J. Golden | | |
| 72 | Illustration | John De Pol: A Celebration of His Work by Many Hands | — | | |
| 73 | Illustration | A Canticle to the Waterbirds | William Everson | | |
| 74 | Illustration | A Canticle to the Waterbirds | William Everson | | |
| 75 | Illustration | The Bread of Days | — | | |
| 76 | Illustration | 36 Drawings | Sarah Peter | | |
| 77 | Illustration | Pochoir | Vance Gerry | | |
| 78 | Illustration | Das Mittagsmahl = Il Pranzo | Christian Morgenstern | | |
| 79 | Illustration | One-handed Basket Weaving | Maulana Jalal Al-Din Rumi | | |
| 80 | Illustration | Palms | John Ridland | | |
| 81 | Illustration | Gleichmass der Unruhe | — | | |
| 82 | Inspiration | David Jackson: Scenes from His Life | David Jackson and James Merrill | | |
| 83 | Inspiration | All My Relations | Susan Lowdermilk | | |
| 84 | Inspiration | Aliens in the Big Apple | Zofia Zaremba | | |
| 85 | Inspiration | As from a Fleece | Gael Turnbull | | |
| 86 | Inspiration | Agrippa | William Gibson | | |
| 87 | Inspiration | Batterers | Denise Levertov | | |
| 88 | Inspiration | The Red Ozier: A Literary Fine Press | Michael Peich | | |
| 89 | Inspiration | Cartesian Dreams | Judith Mohns and Francois Deschamps | | |
| 90 | Inspiration | Notebook Used Along the New Jersey Coast | Walt Whitman | | |

== See also ==
- Artist's book
- Letterpress printing
- Printing press
- Typography
