= Dennis Ashbaugh =

American painter

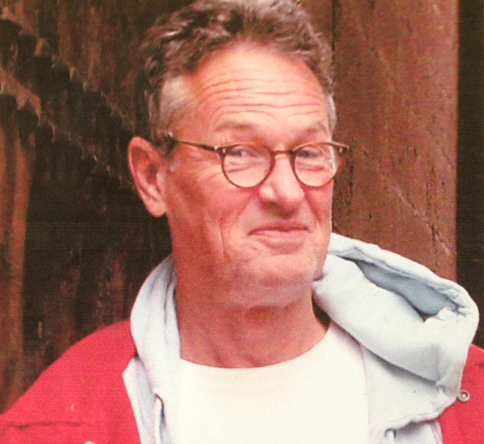
- Born: 1946 (age 79–80); Red Oak, Iowa
- Known for: Abstract art
- Notable work: Agrippa (a book of the dead)
- Awards: Guggenheim Memorial Fellowship

Dennis John Ashbaugh (born 1946 in Red Oak, Iowa) is an American painter and artist who resides in River House in New York City, and also lives and works in Millbrook and Pawling, New York. Date of death: September 4, 2026

== Themes and influences ==
As much as possible, Ashbaugh has avoided being labeled or categorized by various contemporary "isms": Minimalism, Abstract Expressionism, Popism, op art or Color Field Painting. The constant through-line of Ashbaugh's abstract work is a focus on specific current events as seen through the prism of art history, such as the future, politics, computers, clones, DNA, networks and viruses (computer and biological), though he does not use computers to create these works.

In 1992, Ashbaugh collaborated with science fiction and cyberpunk novelist William Gibson on the electronic poem Agrippa (A Book of the Dead). Ashbaugh cites Gibson and fellow cyberpunk novelist Bruce Sterling as key influences, as well as Barnett Newman, Jackson Pollock, and Mark Rothko.

== Early life ==
Ashbaugh's grandfathers were a blacksmith and a large landowner and farmer, his father, an electrical planner, and mother, a beautician. The Ashbaugh family moved to Anaheim, California, where as a child he intently watched the construction of Disneyland.

A major influence in Ashbaugh's life was the newly born California surfing scene of the 1950s and 1960s—the era of surfing greats Phil Edwards, Hobart "Hobie" Alter, Gordon "Grubby" Clark, Carter Pyle, and Bruce Brown with whom he surfed. In 1961, his parents bought a trailer on the ocean in San Clemente, down from where most of the Dana Point Mafia resided. The freedom and independence of surfing shaped his worldview both aesthetically and intellectually.

Throughout his college years, Ashbaugh painted with oil or any paint he could get his hands on, often working on oversize canvases. He received a master's degree in 1969 from California State University, Fullerton. At the age of 19, he met Frank Stella, Barbara Rose, Alan Solomon and Leo Castelli. Stella offered him the use of his studio in Costa Mesa, California, and later encouraged Ashbaugh to move to and paint in New York City.

== Murray Street: "The Ovals" (1970) ==
Through Stella, Rose, and others, Ashbaugh was introduced to many of the well-known working artists, performers, collectors, and gallery owners in New York City, many of whom frequented Max's Kansas City, such as John Chamberlain, Andy Warhol, Larry Poons, Nancy Graves, Carl André, Brice Marden, Robert Rauschenberg.

Ashbaugh leased a studio on Murray Street in Tribeca. He began working on a series entitled "The Ovals" (a reference to Larry Poons): Large fiberglass paintings using an elliptical format and drums of polyester resin. The unyielding, flat surfaces and intentionally ragged edges, obliquely allude to the matte encaustic surfaces that Brice Marden and Jasper Johns were using at the time, albeit with a California twist.

These paintings and drawings evolved directly from the artwork last painted in Costa Mesa, California, and were exhibited at the Orange County Museum of Art (formerly the Newport Harbor Art Museum), the Museum of Contemporary Art San Diego (formerly La Jolla Museum of Contemporary Art).

== Greene Street: "The Shineys" (1971–1972) ==
In 1971, the art dealer Ileana Sonnabend and Henry Geldzahler, Director of Contemporary Art at the Metropolitan Museum of Art, connected Ashbaugh to a space in the center of SoHo. Ashbaugh then sold his Murray Street loft to performance artist Laurie Anderson and moved to 67 Greene Street, a space capable of accommodating his large paintings. Here, Ashbaugh began "The Shineys"—a series of fiberglass paintings, many as large as 120" by 240". The surfaces were glass-like, using polyester resin, industrial dyes, and pigments.

The Shineys were exhibited in solo exhibitions in Sweden [Galleri Ostegren, Malmö, Sweden) and California (Jack Glenn Gallery, Corona del Mar, California), and acquired by the Orange County Museum of Art (formerly the Newport Harbor Art Museum), the Museum of Contemporary Art San Diego (formerly La Jolla Museum of Contemporary Art), and the owners of Artforum Magazine.

== Whitney Museum Solo Exhibition: Russian Agitprop Series (1975) ==
Due to the 1973 Oil Crisis, the use of 50-gallon drums of polyester resins became untenable as prices soared beyond Ashbaugh's means. For inspiration, Ashbaugh turned to the Russian Revolution of 1917, the beginning of abstract, non-objective painting with Malevich, Tatlin, and Lissitzky who themselves were abandoned by the state. Ashbaugh's paintings were extremely large (approximately 120 x 240 inches) and came away six inches from the wall. The hues were limited to primary colors with an unsettling inclusion of a tertiary palette. They were made with oil, and beeswax using an encaustic process, and titled in Russian.

In 1975, the entire series, curated by Marcia Tucker, became a solo exhibition at the Whitney Museum, as well as in Belgium (Galerie Alexandria Monett, Brussels) and France (Galerie Farideh Cadot, Paris).

== Laguna Canyon: The Tijuana to Canada Series (1975–1976) ==
Ashbaugh decided to make work in the warmer months in Laguna Beach, California, where he leased an unfinished indoor-outdoor building with 50-foot ceilings, without doors or windows. He lived in a scaffolding to avoid scorpions and rattlesnakes.

While moving studio equipment from New York to the Canyon Studio, Ashbaugh heard loud noises and sonic booms. Flying at Mach speed, stealth bombers from Camp Pendleton and El Toro Marine Base were practice-flying up and down the canyon corridor. Their twisting, foreshortened configurations were reminiscent to Ashbaugh of the Suprematism work of Malevich and Lissitzky. Further, the planes were constructed with a precursor to Vantablack which disguises all contours. Ashbaugh created large, unwieldy-shaped canvases with the flattest matte paint then available. The paintings were titled for the test flight corridor being used from Tijuana to Canada.

Ashbaugh was awarded the John Simon Guggenheim Fellowship in 1976.

== Greene Street Studio: The Nazca Series (1976–1977) ==
In 1976, Thomas M. Messer, Director of the Guggenheim Museum of Art in New York, recruited Ashbaugh to help organize and install Alfred Jensen's exhibition for the São Paulo Art Biennial representing the United States. While completing the installation, Ashbaugh became aware of the earthworks that were championed by Virginia Dwan, Michael Heizer, Robert Smithson, and Walter De Maria and that were being created in the Nevada desert.

Ashbaugh traveled to Peru, flew over the Nazca Lines, and contacted Maria Reiche, the German scholar and mathematician who had been studying, cataloging, and protecting the drawings in Nazca since 1946. When Ashbaugh returned to New York City, he began construction of the heavily contorted and large 10'x20' shaped Nazca canvas paintings. Ashbaugh thought of them as anthropomorphized planar geometry or as alien landing strips and imagined them placed on a wall vertically, not flat on the ground as in the earthworks in Nazca and Nevada.

Founder Alanna Heiss at PS1 Project Room in Brooklyn, now the Museum of Modern Art, curated the construction and installation of the work influenced by the Peru trip.

== San Onofre Woofers Series: Double and Triple Shadows (1979–1984) ==
At the Dia Art Foundation, Ashbaugh saw from Andy Warhol's Hammer and Sickle work, that two shapes, even three distinct shapes, would cast only one combined shadow. He began a series paintings with multiple images but only one combined shadow. These works are loosely painted in fluorescents with swaths of glow-in-the-dark pigments. Seen with the lights off, they eerily resemble the frenetic brushwork of Willem de Kooning or Franz Kline. Ashbaugh became fascinated by the new technology of paint chemistry and also applied flocking to the surfaces.

Since 1974, Ashbaugh has focused on First Amendment rights with concern for the degradation of journalistic news into a propaganda tool or a pop culture sales hook. In 1979, The Metropolitan Museum of Art in New York City acquired a 108”x108" inch painting from the series titled "New Yorker Faces Iran Spy Trial". The title came from a headline of the sensationalist tabloid the New York Post, as was each painting in the entire Woofer Series.

Ashbaugh's San Onofre Series (1980) had solo exhibitions at Knoedler Kasmin Gallery in London; the Richard Gray Gallery in Chicago; and the Janie C. Lee Gallery, Houston, as well as acquisitions by the Hirshhorn Museum of Art in Washington, D.C. and at Stanford University, the Orange County Museum of Art, and the Houston Museum of Fine Arts. These paintings were exhibited globally, traveling to England, Portugal, Australia, and South Africa. Natalie Knight Gallery (Johannesburg, South Africa), the Gulbenkian Foundation (Lisbon, Portugal), and the Swiss Art Foundation (Switzerland).

== The Fashion World Exploits (1983–1984) ==
In 1983, Anna Wintour, the newly appointed editor of New York Magazine, asked a group of artists, including Dennis Ashbaugh, Jean-Michel Basquiat, David Salle, for permission to include their work in a fashion shoot for publication. The issue was called "The Art Beat". Wintour was taken by way that Ashbaugh had incorporated the models into the staged artwork and made the decision to use this image as the magazine's centerfold. When told of the image's placement Ashbaugh requested that the centerfold become a scratch and sniff that smelled of the models' perfume, a tribute to old porn magazines, a proposal that was of course rejected. The popular issue elevated Ms. Wintour to the position of editor in chief of Vogue. Ms. Wintour and Alexander Liberman commissioned Ashbaugh to do an eight-page spread for Condé Nast using his brightly colored images.

== Interactive Paintings: The Clone Series (1987) ==
With the many advancements in DNA and computer technologies, Ashbaugh believed there must be a viable path forward for abstract painting. As Barbara Rose stated, "Like Pollock, Ashbaugh is keenly aware that innovations in technology require a thoughtful response from artists who are awake to their own time". He began working on the large-scale, colorful Clone Series, conceptually based on the idea that the entirety of art history could be placed on a single floppy disk. These paintings were shown in a retrospective at IVAM in Valencia, Spain, 2007.

== Computer Viruses (1988–1990) ==
In 1988 the first computer virus was created by Robert Tappan Morris, a Cornell University student. Ashbaugh recognized it as a major technological and cultural event where computer information could be created then co-opted and deleted. He perceived this as a paradigm shift—that information would never again be the same. Reminded of Robert Rauschenberg's erasure of the Willem de Kooning drawing, Ashbaugh embarked on painting a series of large black and fluorescent works using the visual images located in the aftermath of a virus attack, or in his words, "a new beginning". The works were painted with glossy industrial floor enamel and epoxy, appearing as blank television screens with color charts, inserted on either the upper or lower framing edge. Solo exhibitions followed at the Marisa del Re Gallery, Paul Kasmin Gallery, and IVAM (Valencia, Spain).

== DNA Gene Stain Paintings (1989–1990) ==
The Human Genome Project, launched in 1990 by James Watson and Craig Venter gave Ashbaugh the idea of the Gene Stain Paintings. He used washes of color, alluding to Morris Louis's stain paintings and subtle markings on large-scale canvases.

When art history scholar and critic Robert Rosenblum first saw this work in 1990, he remarked, "Why would anyone want to make stain paintings now"? Ashbaugh reminded the critic that as early as 1946, Barnett Newman had painted a work titled “The Genetic Moment.” Ashbaugh executed these paintings at various makeshift outdoor studios due to the extreme toxicity of the paints used.

The Gene Stain Paintings were exhibited at the National Academy of Sciences, the Marisa del Re Gallery, the Paul Kasmin Gallery and IVAM. Print editions were acquired by Microsoft Corporation, Lincoln Center, and State Department Art Collections in Embassies.

== Agrippa (A Book of the Dead) (1992) ==
A collaborative book by the founder of cyberpunk, William Gibson and Dennis Ashbaugh was published in 1992 in two limited editions (Deluxe and Small) and entitled Agrippa (A Book of the Dead). The book included copperplate aquatint etchings (Ashbaugh) and a poem (Gibson).

See separate Wikipedia entry: Agrippa (A Book of the Dead)

== Degraded DNA Paintings (1995–1996) ==
In the early 1990s, there was much discussion in the forensic and scientific communities, as well as in the culture at large, as to what fraction of DNA was required to make an accurate analysis of ancestry, race, and origin. Working outdoors, Ashbaugh became aware of rust as well as the elements of sun, acid rain, and snow to cause entropic decay. He used Corten steel dust, and fugitive fluorescent pigments, which degrade with ultraviolet rays, on large canvases and placed them outside for a year. The components turned into a rich rusted patina on 108”x108" canvases. They resembled used paintings and made allusions to the paintings of Anselm Kieffer and Julian Schnabel and were exhibited at Marisa del Re Gallery and IVAM.

== Hiding in Plain Sight (2004–2007) ==
The issues of privacy and identity became a deep concern for Ashbaugh. In 2006, the company 23andMe, began selling DNA kits for purposes of genealogical inquiry—individual heritage studies for home use—accumulating vast quantities of data. Later at the Whitehead Institute in Cambridge Massachusetts, Ashbaugh met Yaniv Erlich an Israeli scientist whose laboratory had just determined that no genetic information is private and can be accessed by anyone.

Ashbaugh had been painting large DNA works with saturated colors like the washes of his earlier series. Each of the brightly colored paintings of a typical human genetic sequence was now covered with camouflage so that any adequate reading of the sequence could not be accurately determined.

This series was shown at IVAM in Valencia, Spain, as a part of the major 2007 Ashbaugh retrospective organized by critic Barbara Rose, and at the National Academy of Sciences.

== Personal life ==
He is the longtime companion of author Alexandra Penney. He has been characterized by The New York Times as a "charismatic ex‐surfer whose address book can probably hold its own against that of the most aggressive jet set type".

== Awards ==
- Barnett and Annalee Newman Foundation Grant Award Recipient (2024-2025).
- First Place, United States Olympic Architecture Design Competition (1996)
- John Simon Guggenheim Foundation Fellowship (1976)
- C.A.P.S., New York State Council on the Arts (1975)

== Selected solo exhibitions ==
- Institut Valencia d’Art Modern IVAM (a retrospective of works), Valencia, Spain (2007)
- National Academy of Sciences, Washington, DC (2006)
- Margulies-Taplan Gallery, Miami, FL (1994)
- Marisa, del Re Gallery, New York, NY (1993)
- Goode Crowley Editions, Houston, TX (1993)
- The Americas Society, New York, NY (1992)
- The Metropolitan Museum of Art Mezzanine Gallery, New York, NY (1992)
- The Kitchen, New York, NY (1992)
- Margulies-Taplan Gallery, Miami, FL (1990)
- Paul Kasmin Gallery, New York, NY (1990)
- Paul Kasmin Gallery, New York, NY (1989)
- Charles Cowles Gallery, New York, NY (1982)
- Richard Gray Gallery, Chicago, IL (1982)
- Charles Cowles Gallery, New York, NY (1982)
- Kasmin-Knoedler Gallery, London, England (1981)
- Charles Cowles Gallery, New York, NY (1980)
- Janie C. Lee Gallery, Houston, TX (1980)
- Galerie Farideh Cadot, Paris, France (1979)
- PS I, Long Island City Project Rooms, NY (1977)
- Seattle Art Museum, Seattle, WA (1976)
- Whitney Museum of American Art, New York, NY (1975)
- Galleri Ostergren, Malmö, Sweden (1972)
- Newport Harbor Art Museum, Newport Beach, CA (1971)
- Gallery Farideh Cadot, Paris, France (1970)
- La Jolla Museum of Contemporary Art, La Jolla, CA (1970)

== Selected Collections ==
- Boca Raton Museum of Art, FL
- Brooklyn Museum, NY
- Crocker National Bank, San Francisco, CA
- Drew University, Madison, NJ
- First City Bank, Houston, TX
- First National Bank of Minnesota, MN
- First National City Bank, New York, NY
- Florida International University Museum, FL
- General Electric Co., New York, NY
- London Getty Museum of Art, Malibu, CA
- Gilman Paper Company, St. Mar's, GA
- Gulbenkian Foundation, Lisbon, Portugal
- Hirschhorn Museum and Sculpture Garden, Washington, D.C.
- Houston Museum of Fine Arts, Houston, TX
- Illinois State University, Normal, IL
- Knight Rider Publications, Miami, FL
- Lincoln Center for the Performing Arts, New York, NY
- Los Angeles County Museum of Art, CA
- Lowe Art Museum, Miami, FL
- Manufacturers Hanover Trust, New York
- Martin Z. Margulies, Grove Island, Coconut Grove, FL
- Metropolitan Museum of Art, New York
- Museum of Modern Art, Teheran, Iran
- National Gallery of Art, Washington, D.C.
- Newport Harbor Art Museum, CA
- New York City Public Library, NY
- Owens Corning, New York, NY
- Queensborough College, Bayside, NY
- Rolls Royce, Inc., New York, NY
- San Francisco Museum of Art, San Francisco, CA
- Seattle First National Bank, Seattle, WA
- Seattle Museum of Contemporary Art, Seattle, WA
- Security Pacific Bank, Los Angeles, CA
- Stanford University Art Museum, Palo Alto, CA
- The Swiss Art Foundation, Switzerland
- University of California at Berkeley Art Museum, CA
- Worcester Art Museum, Worcester, MA

== Selected Network Coverage ==
- "Paradise Now": Focus, Regional News Network, NY/CT/NJ, September 12, 2000.
- "Art and Mind": Produced by Mimi Tompkins, Bravo Television, December 2000.
- "Gene Thoughts": Australia Television, December 2000.
- "Agrippa," CBS, December 18, 1992.
- "Agrippa," ZDF Television, Germany, December 1992.
