= John Frederick Nims =

American poet and academic (1913–1999)

John Frederick Nims (November 20, 1913 in Muskegon, Michigan – January 13, 1999, aged 85, in Chicago, Illinois) was an American poet and academic.

== Life ==
He graduated from DePaul University, University of Notre Dame with an M.A., and from the University of Chicago with a Ph.D. in 1945. He published reviews of early works by Robert Lowell and W. S. Merwin. He taught English at Harvard University, the University of Florence, the University of Toronto, Williams College, University of Missouri, and the University of Illinois at Chicago.

He was editor of Poetry magazine from 1978 to 1984.

The John Frederick Nims Memorial Prize, for poetry translation, is awarded by the Poetry Foundation.

== Awards ==
- American Academy of Arts and Letters grant
- National Foundation for the Arts and Humanities grant
- Institute of the Humanities fellowship
- 1982 Academy of American Poets fellowship
- 1986 Guggenheim Fellowship
- 1991 Aiken Taylor Award for Modern American Poetry.
- 1993 O.B. Hardison Prize

== Bibliography ==
- The Powers Of Heaven And Earth: New And Selected Poems (Louisiana State University Press, 2002)
- Western wind. Random House. 1992. ISBN 978-0-07-046574-9.
- Zany in Denim (University of Arkansas Press, 1990)
- The Six-Cornered Snowflake and Other Poems. New Directions Publishing. 1990. ISBN 978-0-8112-1143-7. "John Frederick Nims.", selected for the New York Public Library's Ninety from the Nineties.
- The Kiss: A Jambalaya (1982)
- Selected poems. University of Chicago Press. 1982. ISBN 978-0-226-58118-7.
- Of Flesh and Bone (1967)
- Knowledge of the Evening (1960), which was nominated for a National Book Award
- A Fountain in Kentucky (1950)
- The Iron Pastoral. William Sloane Associates. 1947.
- Five Young American Poets (1944)

=== Anthologies ===
- Robert Hedin, ed. (1996). "Trainwrecked Soldiers". The great machines: poems and songs of the American railroad. University of Iowa Press. p. 34. ISBN 978-0-87745-550-9. "John Frederick Nims."

=== Translations ===
- Euripides: Four Tragedies (1958)
- Sappho to Valery: Poems in Translation (1971)
- Saint John of the Cross (1979). Poems of St. John of the Cross. Translated by John Frederick Nims. University of Chicago Press. ISBN 978-0-226-40110-2.
- Western Wind: An Introduction to Poetry (1983)
- Michelangelo Buonarroti (1998). The complete poems of Michelangelo. Translated by John Frederick Nims. University of Chicago Press. ISBN 978-0-226-08033-8.

=== Editor ===
- Ovid's Metamorphoses: The Arthur Golding Translation of 1567 (1965)
- John Frederick Nims, ed. (1981). The Harper anthology of poetry. Harper & Row. ISBN 978-0-06-044847-9.

=== Criticism ===
- Martin Lammon, ed. (1996). "The Greatest English Lyric?". Written in water, written in stone: twenty years of Poets on poetry. University of Michigan Press. ISBN 978-0-472-06634-6.
