= Douglass Morse Howell =

American papermaker and artist (1906–1994)

- Born: November 30, 1906; New York City, New York, US
- Died: February 6, 1994 (aged 87); Hackettstown, New Jersey, US
- Known for: art papers, papermaking
- Spouse: Alice Orcutt
- Children: 4

Douglass Morse Howell (November 30, 1906 – February 6, 1994) was an American papermaker, educator, and Modernist painter. He is known a pioneer in the field of paper art.

== Early life and education ==
Douglass Morse Howell was born in November 30, 1906, in New York City, New York. His mother was Edna Mary Howell, a foreign correspondent for the Associated Press. Howell grew up in Florence and Genoa. He attended University of Turin. In 1930 during the Great Depression, he returned to the United States to work as a banker and literary agent.

== Career ==
By the mid-19th century, making paper by hand was extinct in the United States. By 1912, fine book printer and publisher, Dard Hunter had reestablished the craft of fine hand paper making but by the 1930s the craft had lapsed in interest again. During World War II, Howell served in the military for five years. When Howell returned to New York City after serving in World War II, he established himself as a fine printer and discovered that art paper was in short supply. During the 1940s and 1950s, Howell started reading Hunter’s books on paper making, as well as learning about hand paper making history, conducted paper making research, and learned about printed books.

In May 1946, Howell had married educator Alice Orcutt (later known as Alice Howell Andersen) in New York City, the marriage ended in divorce. They had four children, including daughter, Elisabeth Howell King.

The handmade papers were used for printmaking, artist book making, collage, drawing and watercolors. Howell created special handmade paper for artists Jackson Pollock, Jasper Johns, Larry Rivers, Alfonso A. Ossorio, and others. Later in his career, he moved the paper making operations to Long Island, New York. In 1993, Howell was honored by the American Craft Council as a gold medalist.

Howell died on February 6, 1994, in Hackettstown, New Jersey. His work is included in public museum collections including at the Art Institute of Chicago, the Harvard Art Museums, and other places.

One of his papermaking students was artist Golda Lewis (1915 – 2005).
