= Mountain House (Chillicothe, Ohio) =

Historic house in Ohio, United States

- U.S. National Register of Historic Places
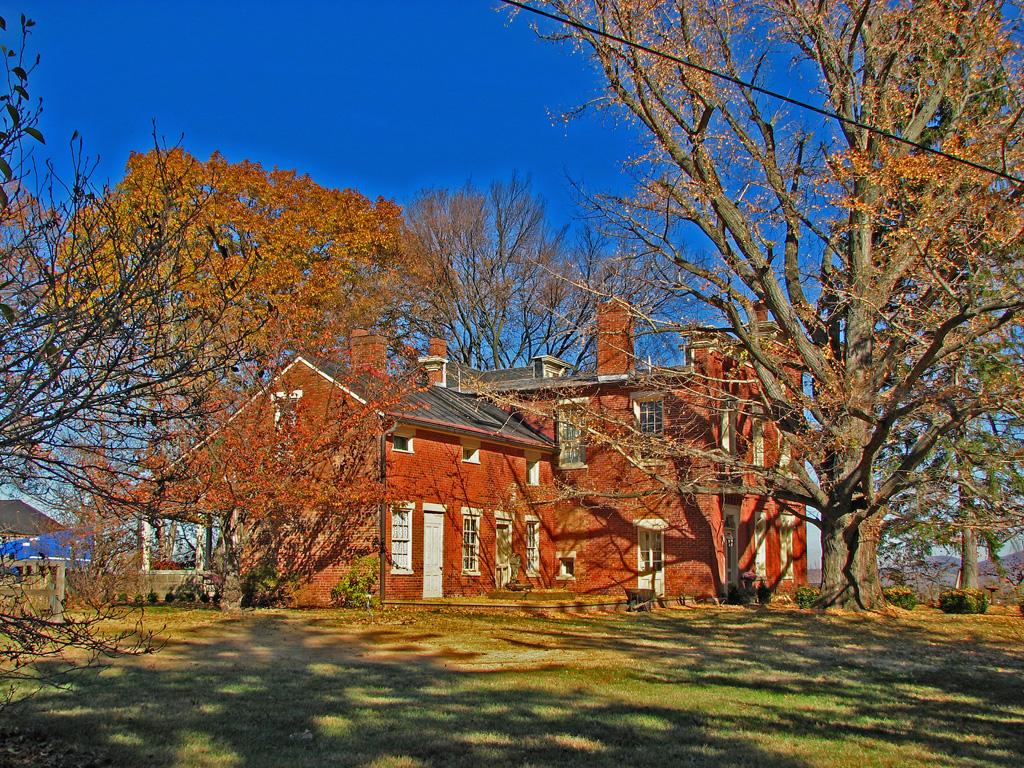
- Street view of the Mountain House

- Location within Ohio Location within the United States
- Location: Highland Ave., Chillicothe, Ohio
- Coordinates: 39°19′55″N 82°59′29″W
- Area: less than one acre
- Built: 1852
- Architect: Oscar Janssen
- Architectural style: Gothic Revival, Romanesque Revival
- NRHP reference No.: 78002181
- Added to NRHP: December 29, 1978

The Mountain House is a historic Gothic Revival house in western Chillicothe, Ohio, United States. It was built by German immigrant Oscar Janssen in 1852, sitting atop a bluff above the Scioto River and the rest of the city of Chillicothe; its location and architectural style were intended to resemble that of castles overlooking the Rhine in his homeland. Janssen surrounded his house with vineyards, a winery, and a beer garden; because of the house's location on the edge of a steep hillside, he terraced the hillside before developing it. After Janssen's lifetime, the Mountain House passed into the hands of designer and papermaker Dard Hunter. Purchasing the house in 1919, Hunter converted it into a production center for his handmade paper and hand-carven type. Here he produced a wide range of books, publishing them under the banner of the Mountain House Press, and gradually he built a worldwide reputation.

The two-story Mountain House mixes various architectural styles and materials. Although it is primarily a Gothic Revival structure, with details such as Gothic arches for windows and doors, it also includes a significant number of Romanesque Revival elements. Its brick walls rest on a stone foundation, and the interior may be accessed through large wooden doors.

In 1978, the Mountain House was listed on the National Register of Historic Places. It qualified for this distinction both because of its well-preserved historic architecture and because of its connection to Hunter, who was seen as a significant person in local history. Today, the house remains in use as the offices of the Mountain House Press.
