= Dard Hunter =

American authority on printing, paper and papermaking (1883–1966)

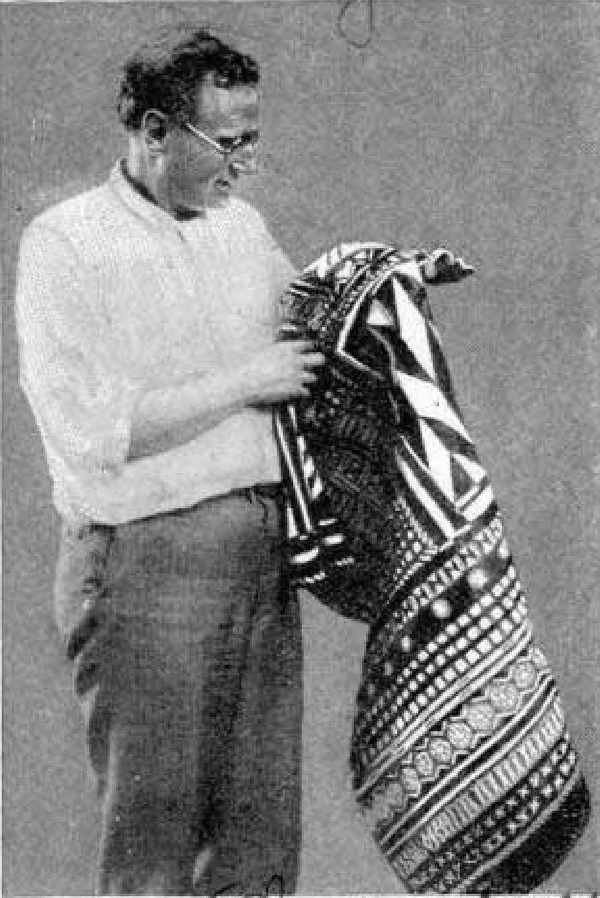
- Born: William Joseph Hunter; November 29, 1883; Steubenville, Ohio, US
- Died: February 20, 1966 (aged 82); Chillicothe, Ohio, US
- Resting place: Grandview Cemetery (Chillicothe, Ohio)
- Known for: papermaking, printmaking, paper art

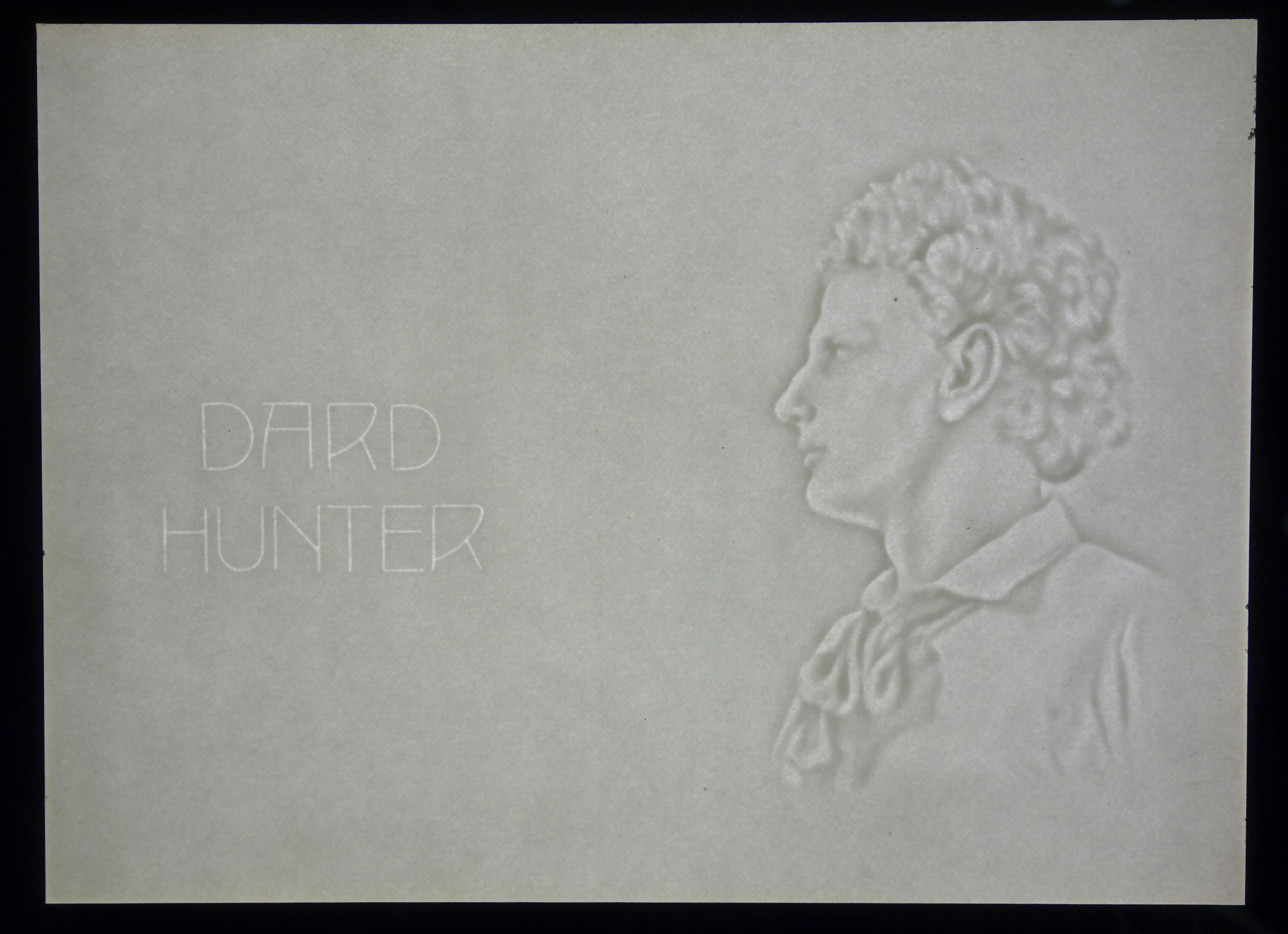
Dard Hunter, self-portrait in watermark

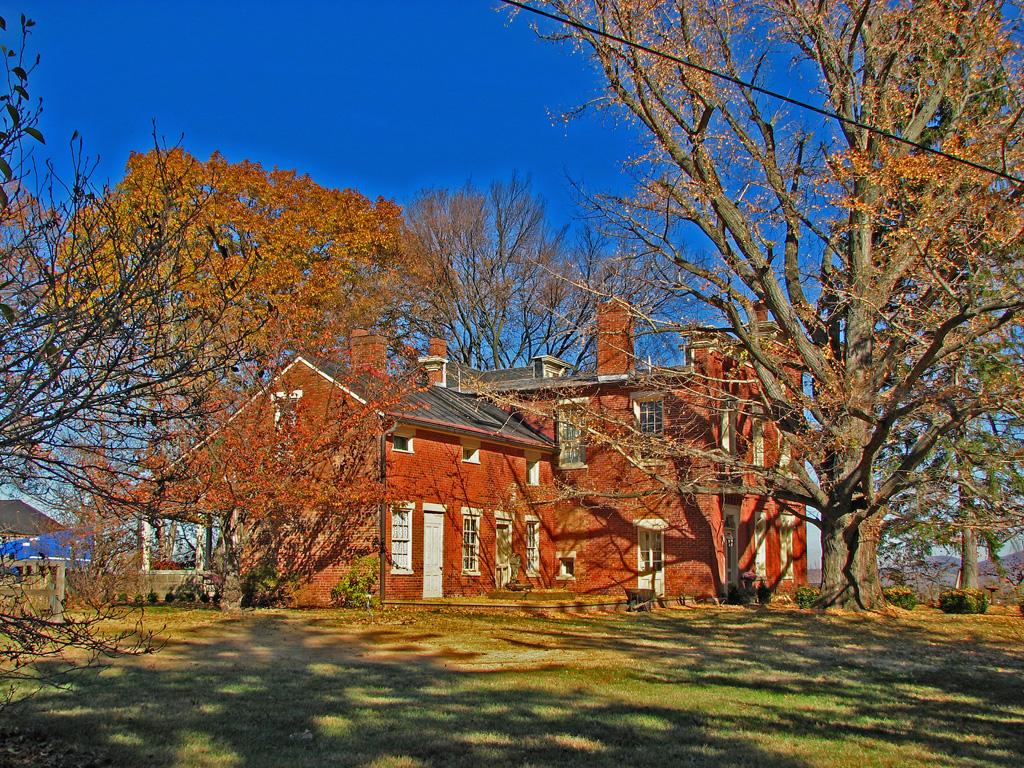
Front of the Mountain House in Chillicothe

William Joseph "Dard" Hunter (November 29, 1883 – February 20, 1966) was an American authority on printing, paper, and papermaking, especially by hand, using sixteenth-century tools and techniques. He is known for, among other things, the production of two hundred copies of his book Old Papermaking, for which he prepared all aspects: Hunter wrote the text, designed and cast the type, did the typesetting, handmade the paper, and printed and bound the book. A display at the Smithsonian Institution that appeared with his work read, "In the entire history of printing, these are the first books to have been made in their entirety by the labors of one man." He also wrote Papermarking by Hand in America (1950), a similar but even larger undertaking.

Active in the Arts and Crafts movement, Hunter created and championed many other types of handmade arts and crafts, publishing his own guides, such as Things You Can Make. He experimented with pottery, jewelry, stained glass windows, and furniture. He also founded a correspondence school, the Dard Hunter School of Handicrafts.

== Biography ==
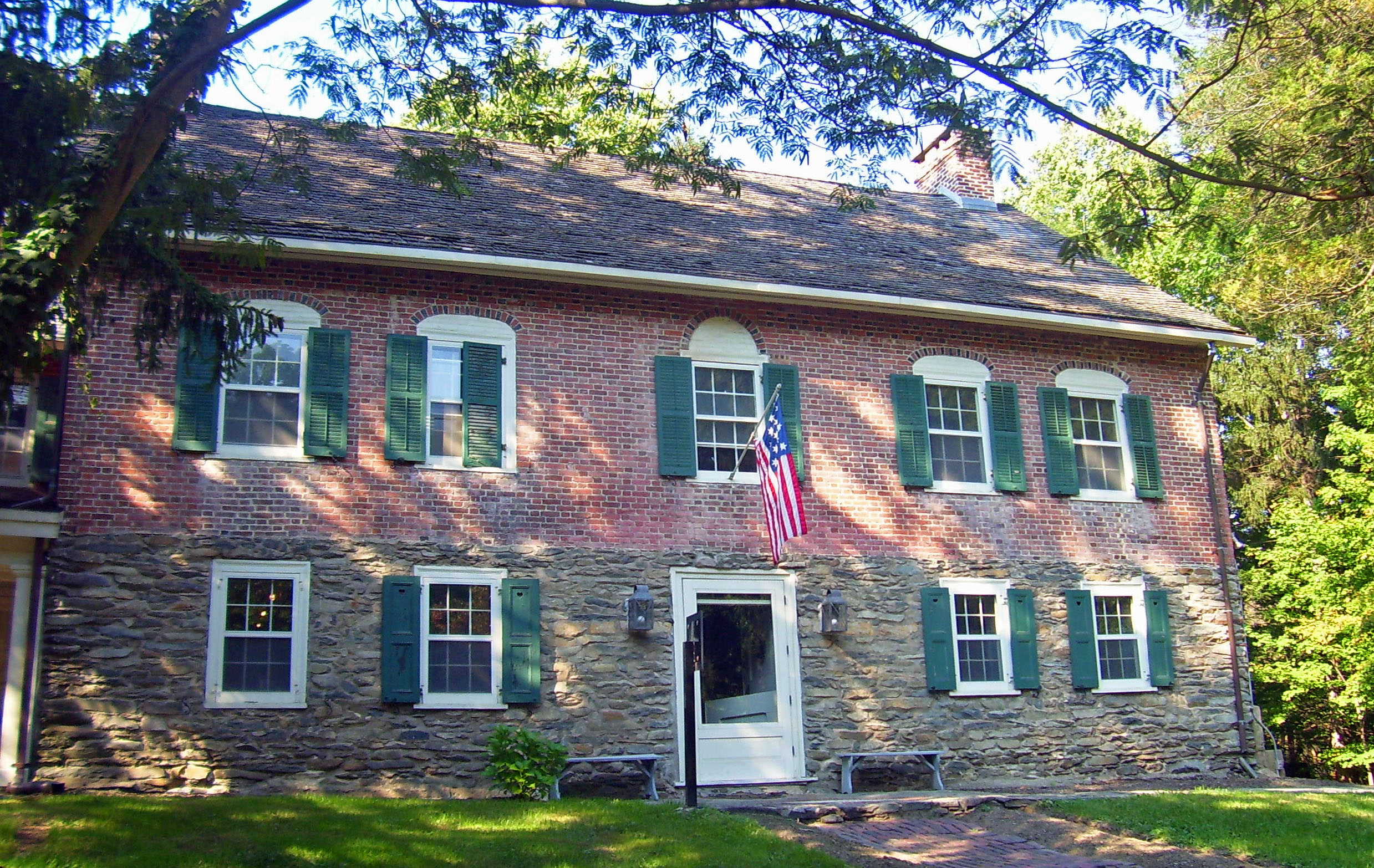
The Gomez Mill House, home to the Hunter family during the 1910s

Hunter was born and raised in Steubenville, Ohio, where his father published a gazette and ran a printery. From 1900 to 1903 he attended The Ohio State University. He began his career in East Aurora, New York, with a job at Roycroft, the Arts and Crafts company of Elbert Hubbard. In 1908, Hunter married Edith Cornell, a pianist he met at Roycroft, and the couple honeymooned in Vienna, a location inspired by Hunter's interest in Josef Hoffmann. Hunter returned to Europe to study papermaking in Italy, and was graduated from Vienna's Royal-Imperial Graphic Teaching and Experimental Institute (K. K. Graphische Lehr und Versuchsanstalt).

The couple went to London in 1911, where he worked as a commercial designer with Norfolk Studios. An exhibit at the London Science Museum provoked his interest in papermaking. In his exploration of primitive and early papermaking, he would travel to East Asia and Pacific locales such as Samoa, Tonga, and Fiji.

In 1912, they returned to the United States, and Hunter bought and moved into the Gomez Mill House near Marlboro, New York. He built a small papermill there, and crafted his first books on papermaking. Handmade paper was not being produced in America at the time; it had to be purchased from Europe. His English papermaking appliances were three centuries old, and were operated by a wooden water wheel. Over forty-six years, he wrote twenty books about papermaking, eight of which were hand-printed.

In 1919, the Hunter family returned to Ohio and purchased the 1852 "Mountain House" in Chillicothe, which had been built for German winemakers. Hunter used a wing joined to the house for his letterpress printing studio, named Mountain House Press, where he produced eight handmade books, authored twenty books on the topic of papermaking, and was an active publisher between 1922 and 1956. In 1958 he published his autobiography, My Life with Paper.

The year 1930 saw production start in a commercial one-vat mill, in a former iron foundry on the Salmon Fells Kill in Lime Rock, Connecticut, he had purchased and started transforming in 1928. It represented an expenditure, all told, of close to $35,000, about $488,000 in 2017 value. Although operating until 1933, it was a financial failure.

Hunter opened the Dard Hunter Paper Museum at the Massachusetts Institute of Technology in 1939, which he considered his greatest accomplishment. It was moved to the Institute of Paper Chemistry in Appleton, Wisconsin, in 1954. The Robert C. Williams Museum of Papermaking now comprises most of the collection of the Institute of Paper Science and Technology, on the campus of the Georgia Institute of Technology in Atlanta.

Hunter was a Rosenbach Fellow in Bibliography at the University of Pennsylvania.

== Death and legacy ==
Hunter died on February 20, 1966, at Chillicothe, Ohio. His wife had died in 1951. Hunter is buried in Grandview Cemetery, Chillicothe.

Members of his family maintain Dard Hunter Studios at the historic Mountain House, which are open to the public by appointment. The studio provides an online library. In addition to books written during his lifetime, Dard Hunter & Son is a tribute to the work of Hunter. The 1998 book was selected and exhibited in the New York Public Library's 2003–2004 exhibition Ninety from the Nineties.

To promote and continue the tradition of hand papermaking and book arts and to support the preservation of Hunter's collection, the Friends of the Dard Hunter Paper Museum (later renamed Friends of Dard Hunter, then North American Hand Papermakers) was established in 1981.

Hunter's books on papermaking were inspirational to papermaker Douglass Morse Howell.
