= S. R. Lavin =

American poet (1945–2019)

- Born: April 2, 1945; Springfield, Massachusetts, U.S.
- Died: January 12, 2019 (aged 73)
- Occupations: Poet; Novelist
- Writing career
- Period: 1968-2017

S. R. Lavin (April 2, 1945 – January 12, 2019), also known as Sholom Lavin, was an American poet and novelist. Lavin's work was published in the U.S., England, Poland, China, The Netherlands, Japan and Israel.

== Early and personal life ==
Stuart Roy Lavin was born in Springfield, Massachusetts on April 2, 1945, to Frederick and Selma Lavin. Lavin attended American International College in Springfield, graduating in 1967 with a bachelor's degree in literature. He went on to attend Trinity College in Hartford, graduating in 1970 with a master's degree in literature.

Lavin married Rosemary Dredge, of Los Angeles, in January 1978. The couple divorced in 1992, but remarried in 2000; Rosemary died later in 2000.

== Career ==
Lavin began writing poetry while at Trinity. His debut poetry collection, To a City Girl I have Forgotten, was published by Heron Press, which was founded by Lavin's longtime friend and collaborator, Bruce Chandler. Lavin was a poet-in-residence at Clark University and Northampton School for Girls.

In 1974, Lavin and Chandler founded The Four Zoas: A Journal of Poetry & Letters in Ware, Massachusetts, which published work by poets such as Gerard Malanga and George Oppen. The Four Zoas Press was co-founded by Lavin and Dan Carr, of Ware, MA; together, they printed The Four Zoas Journal of Poetry and Letters, which published work by Gerard Malanga, George Oppen, Willam S. Burroughs, and Carr and Lavin, among many others. Carr and Lavin were awarded N.E.A. funding to support small press publications on many occasions between 1972 and 1982. Correspondence between S.R. Lavin and George Oppen is detailed in the publication The Selected Letters of George Oppen by Rachel Blau DuPlessis.

After 1990, Lavin began to focus on fiction and nonfiction works.

Lavin also taught "composition, public speaking and creative writing" at Castleton State College and Community College of Vermont.

=== Poetry collections ===
- To a City Girl I have Forgotten (Heron Press, 1968)
- A Ballad of the Cinema Kid (Heron Press, 1969)
- Rothman's Secret Love Lament (Yorick Books, 1969)
- The Stonecutters at War with the Cliff Dwellers (Heron Press, 1971)
- Cambodian Spring (Heron Press, 1973)
- Journey to a Lone Star (Four Zoas Press, 1976)
- Big Meadow / New River (Jerusalem House, 1978)
- Let Myself Shine. New York City: The Kulchur Foundation. 1979. ISBN 978-0686654841.
- Voice in the Whirlwind. New York City: Dorrance Publishing. 2012-10-22. ISBN 978-1434967596.

=== Novels ===
- Lavin, S. R. (2017). Mahat: The Essence of Being. Lady June Press. ISBN 978-0-9983773-0-8.

=== Non-fiction ===
Lavin, S. R. (3 June 2018). God's People in Search of a Destiny: A Look into the Twelve Tribes Messianic Communities. ISBN 978-1-9830695-1-2.
