= Golgonooza Letter Foundry and Press =

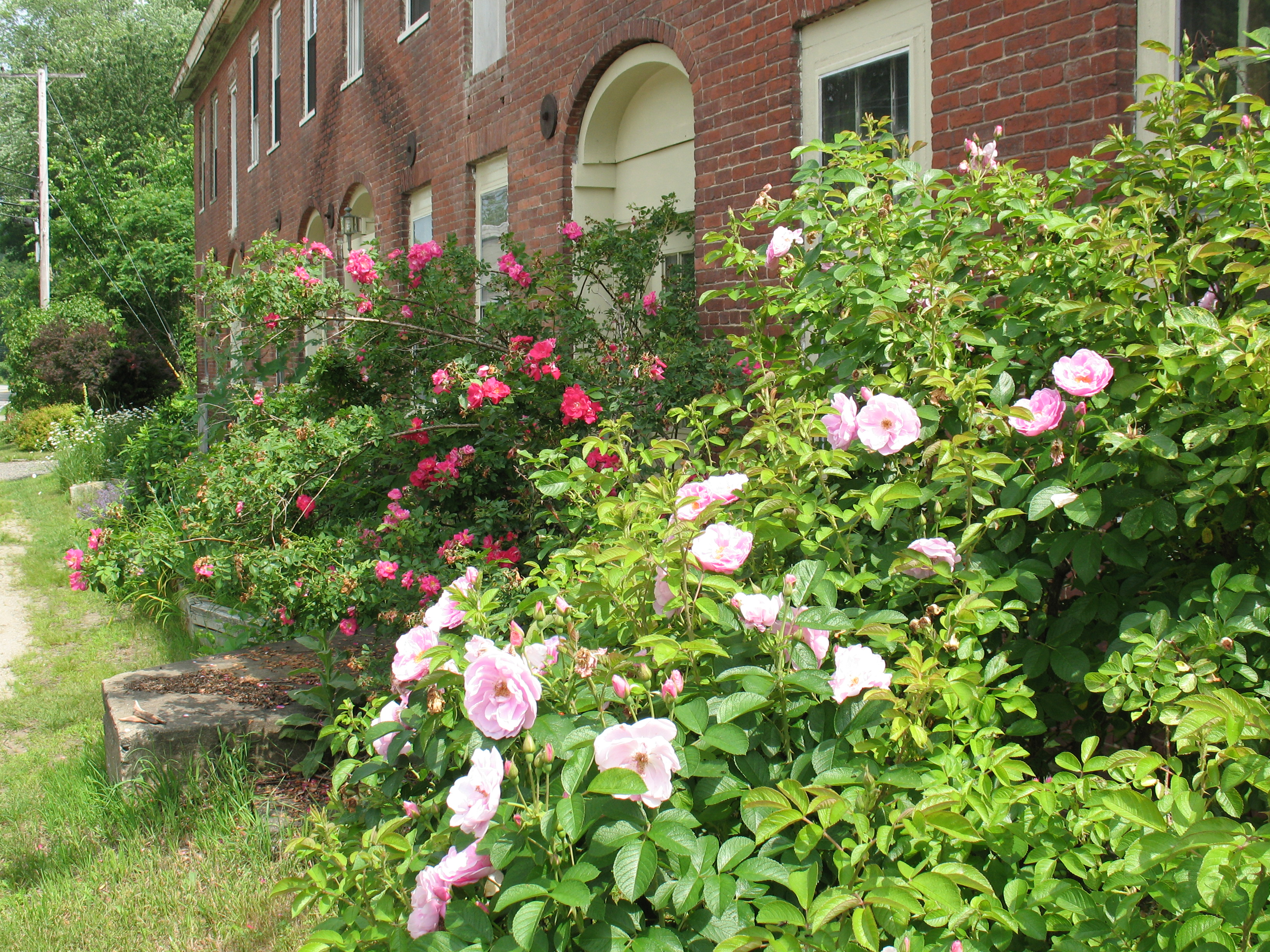

Golgonooza Letter Foundry & Press, named after the city of art and imagination in the poetry of William Blake, is a printing press founded in Boston, Massachusetts, by partners Dan Carr and Julia Ferrari in 1979. The press moved to New Hampshire in 1982. It focuses on preserving the arts of letterpress printing, punch cutting, and bookbinding through the creation of handmade books as well as the education of both students and interns. Golgonooza Letter Foundry & Press and its subsidiary businesses Enitharmon Bindery and Trois Fontaines publishing are currently run by owner and co-founder Ferrari after the death of Carr in 2012.

== Founding ==
Ferrari and Carr started the foundry together in a 19th-century textile mill building in Ashuelot, New Hampshire, which doubled as both their home and studio. The two had previously been based out of Boston, where Ferrari studied fine arts and Carr ran a small press named the Four Zoas, which would later be renamed Four Zoas Night House (also named after the poetry of William Blake). The two met when Carr advertised for poets who were looking for a platform to publish their writings, and taught them how to letterpress print and hand-bind books. Ferrari was one of two students, along with Mark Olson of Innerer Klang Letterpress, who stayed for the duration of the courses. After some time working together, Carr and Ferrari became business partners.

== Work ==
Carr was a creator of both original hand-cut and digital typefaces for the foundry; at the time he was one of two people in the United States using punch-cutting to create metal type. Carr studied hand-carving steel faces in France under the remaining punch cutters: Nelly Gable and Christian Paput; he earned a master's of typographic punchcutting from the Imprimerie nationale in Paris. Carr later went on to create two award-winning letterpress typefaces named Regulus and Parmenides and two digital typefaces named Cheneau and Philosophie (a Bukvaraz 2001 award for "Parmenides," a metal type for archaic Greek and a judges' choice award by the Type Directors Club in 2000 for his digital typeface "Cheneau"). After Carr's death, Ferrari continued running the press and its associated businesses.
