= The Absence of the Book =

Essay by Maurice Blanchot

"The Absence of the Book" is an essay by French philosopher and literary theorist Maurice Blanchot which appeared in his 1993 collection The Infinite Conversation.
