= MindVox =

Early Internet Service Provider, based in NYC

MindVox Corporation
- Company type: Private
- Website type: Social network service
- Available in: Multilingual
- Founded: December 1991; 34 years ago
- Headquarters: New York City, New York, United States
- Area served: Worldwide
- Founders: Bruce Fancher; Patrick K. Kroupa
- Industry: Internet
- Net income: N/A
- Website: http://www.mindvox.com/ (defunct)
- Registration: Required
- Launched: December 1991
- Current status: Defunct

MindVox was an early Internet service provider in New York City. The service was referred to as "the Hells Angels of Cyberspace".

The service was founded in 1991 by Bruce Fancher (Dead Lord) and Patrick Kroupa (Lord Digital), two former members of the Legion of Doom hacker group. It was initially launched in March 1992 as an invite-only offering, and eventually made generally available to the public in November that same year.

MindVox was the second Internet Service Provider in New York City, and the first test message posted to Usenet via the service was created by the infamous hacker Phiber Optik, in 1992, while waiting for a Manhattan grand jury indictment for hacking activities. At this time, customers of the only other service provider had already posted nearly 6,000 messages.

MindVox’s domain phantom.com was registered on 14 February 1992.

== Founding and early years ==
         /\_-\
        <((_))>
         \- \/
 /\_-\(:::::::::)/\_-\
<((_))  MindVox  ((_))>
 \- \/(:::::::::)\- \/
         /\_-\
        <((_))>
         \- \/

The distinctive logo shown to the left was the system's original ASCII art banner, appearing on the text-only service's dial-up login page. MindVox was originally accessible only through telnet, FTP and direct dial-up. Its existence predates the invention of SSH and widespread use of the World Wide Web by several years. In later years, MindVox was also accessible via the web.

The parent company, Phantom Access Technologies, Inc., took its name from a hacking program written by Kroupa during his early teens, called Phantom Access.

MindVox functioned both as a private BBS service, containing its own dedicated discussion groups, termed "conferences" — though usually referred to as "forums" by users — as well as a provider of internet and Usenet access. By 1994 the subscriber base was at around 3,000. In many ways MindVox was a harder, edgier, New York incarnation of the WELL, a famous Northern Californian online community. While users were drawn from all over the world, the majority lived in the New York City area, and members who met through the conferences often became acquainted in person, either on their own, or through meetups that were termed "VoxMeats" (a formal gathering of members, whose double entendre name was rumored to be well-earned).

Prominent MindVox "evangelists" included sci-fi author Charles Platt, who wrote about MindVox for Wired Magazine and featured it within his book Anarchy Online. MindVox also attracted (sometimes with the aid of free accounts) artists, writers and activists, including Billy Idol, Wil Wheaton, Robert Altman, Douglas Rushkoff, John Perry Barlow, and Kurt Cobain. The level of hysteria and hype surrounding MindVox was so great that in 1993 executives at MTV who were using the system wanted to buy it outright and turn MindVox into a subsidiary of Viacom.

== "Voices in My Head" ==
MindVox was deeply connected to the emerging non-academic hacker culture and ideas about the potentials of cyberspace, as can be seen in Patrick Kroupa's essay, Voices in my Head, MindVox: The Overture, which announced the upcoming opening of MindVox, and crossed the line into shaping an entire culture's mythology, seeing publication in magazines such as Wired, and extensive coverage throughout the media. Voices provided a compelling and sweeping first-person overview of the cultural forces that were at play in the hacker underground during the decade that pre-dated MindVox, considered by some the "Golden Age" of cyberspace.

More than a decade later, Voices remains one of the most read and widely distributed pieces of writing about the origins and possible futures of cyberspace. Voices also helped turn MindVox into a counter-cultural media darling meriting full-length features in magazines and newspapers such as Rolling Stone, Forbes, The Wall Street Journal, The New York Times and The New Yorker.

== "Voice: Waffle ][+ the NeXTSTEP" ==
As with many things MindVox-related, the name of the software MindVox ran on, was both a play on words and an elaborate inside-joke. Voice: Waffle ][+ the NeXTSTEP (usually referred to simply as Voice, although it frequently was referred to by the plural Voices as well), was the name given to MindVox's conferencing system. Waffle refers to the original software that MindVox was based on, the ][+ pays homage to Kroupa and Fancher's hacker past and the use of Apple II computers; NeXTSTEP was a reference to the NeXT platform and operating system, with which MindVox was developed and launched.

MindVox promotional materials circa 1993. Phantom Access Technologies glyph raytraced on an 8-ball by MindVox member Tor de Vries.

As much as Patrick Kroupa's Voices focused the media and counter-culture spotlight on MindVox; Fancher's software was a source of tremendous attention in many MindVox-related stories and it's unlikely that MindVox would have enjoyed its success without Voice. At the time MindVox launched, it was one of the first public-access ISPs in the world. The major technical difference between MindVox and every other system at the time, was instead of expecting newcomers to understand Unix and meet a cryptic shell prompt, the entire system was accessible through Fancher's highly flexible interface.

The original Waffle software was written by Tom Dell, who was apparently part of MindVox from its inception. There were also Easter-eggs and cross-references on both MindVox and the system that Tom Dell became better known for in the late 1990s and beyond: Rotten.com. Going to Rotten's search page, and triple-clicking on the whitespace located between the Contact section and the gray bar at the bottom, revealed an inscrutable ibogaine rant.

By the mid-1990s the original Waffle software was nearly unrecognizable; Fancher had converted Voice to a client-server architecture, included a web interface, and added elaborate "power user" features which seem to have been added to address the evolving needs of the community; or due to a strange combination of drugs, nostalgia and pure whim. An example of the latter case is VoxChat, a proprietary chat system written for MindVox by employee David Schenfeld, which spun off into the commercial product ENTchat after MindVox shut down. Diversi-Dial, and the Diversi-Dial spinoff ENTchat, allowed MindVox to connect via the Diversi-Dial chat protocol.), or in Kroupa's own words:

As of this writing there are roughly a dozen remaining DDIAL's running on Apple computers, Novation has long since gone Chapter 11, Bill Basham (the author of DDIAL) has gone back to being a full-time doctor, and one slightly disturbed person in the Phantom Access Group has written the world's only version of DDIAL that will run on Unix based machines and allow T1 connected, distributed sites with gigabytes of disk and thousands of users, to hook into Pig's Knuckle Idaho's very own 7 line DDIAL running at a blazing fast 300 baud. Why this was done is a question best left to mental health professionals.

The last sentence in the paragraph quoted above could be applied to many features present in the MindVox shell,. It included advanced conferencing features interspersed with time-consuming, elaborate in-jokes with no commercial purpose whatsoever.

           -=/[ This Message Has Been FLUNG to the r0mPEr-RuM ]/=-

                                      /\_-\
                                     <((_))>
                                      \- \/
                              /\_-\(:::::::::)/\_-\
                             <((_))  MindVox  ((_))>
                              \- \/(:::::::::)\- \/
                                      /\_-\
                                     <((_))>
                                      \- \/

 -=/[ You have No Rights / [%] Symbolic Iron Cross [%] / Fascism & Tyranny ]/=-

    We have found it necessary to  violate your civil rights and CENSOR you.
    Please  refrain from  engaging in any further  THOUGHT CRIMES.  You will
         not receive additional  warnings, consider yourself fortunate.

The Fling Screen from MindVox. When inappropriate or extremely off-topic material was posted to a conference; moderators were unable to remove or destroy the message entirely, but they could move the message to the r0mPEr-RuM, a conference that was the collective garbage-dump of MindVox.

Later on, the phantom.com MindVox archive continued its relationship with NeXT/NeXTSTEP in the form of Apple Computer's macOS. Instead of using PHP, Perl or Active Server Pages, the entire site ran on Apple's WebObjects.

MindVox was a fusion of many strange parts, pieces and times. While Kroupa might be said to have provided the imaginative backstory of the "thoughtscape", Fancher was largely responsible for the software that made it all work. The synergy of Kroupa, Fancher and the user-base MindVox attracted was a major aspect of MindVox's rise to fame.

== The MindVox shutdown ==
MindVox began to fall apart around 1996, when it ceased operating as an ISP, and shut off dial-up access. While the exact date of the shutdown is disputed, the New York Times lists the closure as occurring in July of that year. Ironically, this happened a few months after New York Magazine voted MindVox as one of the three best ISPs in New York.

A public message noted that free telnet access to the MindVox servers would still be available after the shutdown, but this did not last. While users were given the option to transfer their accounts to Interport Communications, the unique MindVox community did not survive.

Many different reasons have been given for the downfall, including increased competition from the arrival of large-scale providers like AT&T, possible legal difficulties, and the apparent incestuousness of the company and its core users. But none of the theories provided realistic answers as to why the final days of MindVox seem to be closer to The Great Gatsby, and Altered States, than a successful or unsuccessful technology corporation. Much of the legal paperwork from the time reads like something out of The Bonfire of the Vanities.

A 1999 article by Tom Higgins (username "Tomwhore" on the system), a user and one time employee of MindVox, summarized the turbulent closing thus:

So what happened to MindVox? In short its customers happened. Under the strain of pleasing a paying customer base, watching a hobby turn into an industry and simply getting caught up in its own hype, MindVox tumbled into a soap opera nose dive of sex, drugs and mismanagement.

By 1997 Patrick Kroupa had effectively disappeared from public view. The last days of MindVox are more the stuff of mythology than recorded fact, with different publications listing different dates for the shutdown. The New York Times and Wired were apparently unable to arrive at a consensus, with the Times listing the sale of MindVox's client-base and the closing of the system, in 1996, while Wired was still covering an apparently open and at least partially operational MindVox circa 1997.

Additional material suggests MindVox was never fully "closed" but simply closed to the public to become a private, invitation-only system. Rumors of a private, "inside" MindVox circulated, fueled by reprints of supposed internal MindVox messages from 1998 and 1999 that circulated on various mailing lists. The mindvox.com domain remained registered while, for a time, mail to phantom.com was redirected to Interport. The major discrepancy between the Times and Wired dates lends additional credence to the idea that MindVox continued, at least for a while, to support a community after its modem lines were turned off.

== MindVox in the 21st century ==
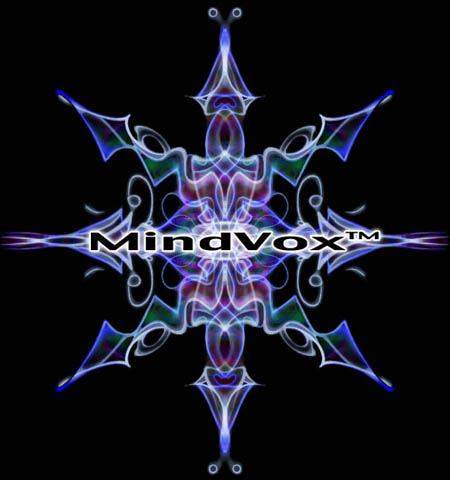
MindVox logo, circa 2007 by Drew Ross.

During 2000 a variety of MindVox pieces went back online, at phantom.com and additional material was released by MindVox to textfiles.com. By 2001, Kroupa was back in the public eye and openly acknowledged being a lifelong heroin addict, who had finally kicked heroin and cocaine through the use of the hallucinogenic drug ibogaine.

It is unclear whether mailing lists on MindVox continued in perpetuity from the 1990s, or began reappearing in 2000, but in addition to the Vox list it was hosting, by 2001 MindVox was a hub of activity in the fields of harm reduction, drug policy reform, and psychedelic drugs (most notably Ibogaine).

While the drug-related community surrounding MindVox : Ibogaine has taken on a completely new life, the interactive system itself as well as the internal conferences and other services MindVox provided, have not returned (despite announcements and plans heralding the perpetually delayed rebirth of MindVox).

In 2005, MindVox was featured in two documentary films. Bruce Fancher is interviewed in BBS: The Documentary, and Patrick Kroupa plays himself in Ibogaine: Rite of Passage.

On December 9, 2005, the Transcriptions Project, placed The Agrippa Files online, which included Matthew G. Kirschenbaum's, "Hacking 'Agrippa': The Source of the Online Text," an excerpt from his book Mechanisms: New Media and the Forensic Imagination. The "Agrippa" discussed by Kirschenbaum was an unusual cyberpunk-influenced media project from 1992 by the science-fiction author William Gibson; its first public "leak" was to MindVox users in December of that year.

Within the chapter, Kirschenbaum references several personal letters to Patrick Kroupa, circa 2003, and reveals that Kroupa cooperated with him by placing all of MindVox back online "for an hour or 5" so that Kirschenbaum could view the context within which Agrippa was originally released. In discussing the service, Kirschenbaum referred to MindVox as "a kind of interface between what Alan Sondheim has aptly called the darknet and the clean, well lighted cyberspaces".

== MindVox reloaded ==
MindVox re-opened in the form of a closed alpha, on December 21st, 2012.
