= Charles Platt (author) =

British author (born 1945)

- Born: Charles Michael Platt; 26 April 1945 (age 81); London, England
- Citizenship: United States
- Occupations: Author, journalist, computer programmer
- Children: Rose Fox
- Relatives: Robert Platt of Grandleford Maurice Platt (father, engineer at Vauxhaul)
- Writing career
- Pen name: Aston Cantwell, Robert Clarke, Charlotte Prentiss and Blakely St. James (house name)
- Language: English

Charles Platt (born 26 April 1945 in London, England) is a British author, journalist and computer programmer. He relocated from England to the United States during 1970 and is a naturalized U.S. citizen. He has one child, Rose Fox, who edits science-fiction, fantasy, and horror book reviews. Platt is the nephew of Robert Platt, Baron Platt of Grindleford.

== Fiction ==
Platt's novel The Silicon Man has been endorsed by William Gibson as "A plausible, well-crafted narrative exploring cyberspace in a wholly new and very refreshing way".

As a fiction writer, Charles Platt has also used pseudonyms: Aston Cantwell (1983), Robert Clarke (Less Than Human, a science-fiction comedy of 1986) and Charlotte Prentiss (historical and prehistory novels, between 1981 and 1999). He contributed to the series of Playboy Press erotic novels with the house pseudonym Blakely St. James that was shared by many other writers during the 1970s.

Platt is also known for writing the novel The Gas during 1970 for the Ophelia Press (OPH-216), an imprint of publisher Maurice Girodias's Olympia Press. (Girodias also published several of Barry N. Malzberg's early novels.) When Platt's novel was published in the United Kingdom by Savoy Books during 1980, copies were seized by the UK's Director of Public Prosecutions.

Platt wrote a variety of science-fiction novels, including Garbage World, Protektor, and Free Zone, and two books in Piers Anthony's Chthon universe, titled Plasm and Soma. He ceased writing science fiction after 1990.

== Nonfiction ==
From 1980 to 1982, Platt interviewed about forty major science-fiction writers such as Andre Norton, Philip K. Dick, J. G. Ballard, Frank Herbert, Isaac Asimov, Kurt Vonnegut, Jr, Ray Bradbury, John Brunner. These interviews were the basis for two books of profiles, Dream Makers (1980) and Dream Makers II (1983). They were nominated for Hugo Awards, and received a Locus Award.

Platt began writing for Wired magazine in its third issue, and ultimately became one of its senior writers, contributing more than thirty full-length features. He was an early user of the internet service provider MindVox and wrote five books on computers and computer programming during that period. His nonfiction has appeared in publications such as Omni, The Washington Post, and the Los Angeles Times.

While covering the 1994 Hackers on Planet Earth Conference for his article "Hackers: Threat or Menace?" in Issue 2.11 of Wired Magazine, Platt annoyed attendees by his interjections during the panel discussion entitled "What is this Cryptography Stuff and Why Should I Care?" Platt repeatedly inquired loudly "Where's the crime?", an exclamation later adopted as a nickname for him by some hackers. The conference organizer, Eric Corley (aka Emmanuel Goldstein) penned a rebuttal to Platt's article and commentary on his methods that was published partially in the "Rants and Raves" section of Wired, Issue 3.02.

Platt's book Make:Electronics was published in December, 2009 by O'Reilly Media. An introductory-level hands-on tutorial, it is available in conjunction with kits of components from Maker Shed. Make:More Electronics (a sequel) and volumes 1, 2, and 3 of Encyclopedia of Electronic Components have since been published, followed by Make: Tools, a basic tutorial in the use of hand tools. All of Platt's books sharing the Make: logo are illustrated with his own drawings and photographs.

== Computer programming ==
Platt acquired an early desktop computer, an Ohio Scientific C4P, and learned to write game programs for it which were distributed as shareware. Subsequently, he wrote educational software published by Trillium Press, and participated in the first conference on cellular automata at MIT, where he demonstrated MS-DOS-based software that he composed and sold by mail order. His program to generate the Mandelbrot Set was also self-published and sold primary to university mathematical departments. He is the author of six computer books, from the satirical Micro-Mania to the instructional Graphics Guide to the Commodore 64. For many years he taught computer graphics classes in Adobe Illustrator and Photoshop at The New School for Social Research in New York City.

== Editing and publishing ==
Platt joined Michael Moorcock's New Worlds team as de facto art director and graphic designer from 1967 to 1970. Although not trained as a graphic designer, he was largely responsible for the collage-like appearance of much of the magazine at the time.

During 1970 Charles Platt became a consulting editor for Avon Books company, acquiring work for their science-fiction list. Subsequently, he performed a similar role for the short-lived paperback trade-name Condor Publishing, and was science-fiction editor for Franklin Watts, Inc.

During the 1980s Platt self-published The Patchin Review, a magazine of literary criticism and commentary emphasizing science fiction. Although each issue sold only 1,000 copies, the venture acquired notoriety for its edgy attitude and attracted contributions from many then-well-known science fiction editors and authors, including Philip K. Dick, Gregory Benford, Brian W. Aldiss, David Hartwell, and others.

During 2007 Platt became a section editor for Make, for which he had already been a frequent contributor. In 2011 he became a contributing editor to the magazine, and retains that title currently.

== Cryonics ==
Platt became interested in cryonics during 1990 after visiting the Alcor Life Extension Foundation. He wrote a book on the subject, Life Unlimited, for which a contract was issued by Wired Books; the publisher ceased doing business, and the text remains unpublished. Platt became President of CryoCare Foundation, which he co-initiated during 1993. He was Director of Suspension Services for Alcor, a company which may be best known for cryopreserving Ted Williams's head and body after he died. During 2004 Platt became a director and General Manager of Suspended Animation, Inc., based in Boynton Beach, Florida. Suspended Animation pursues R&D to develop equipment and procedures for use in mitigating ischemic injury immediately after cardiac arrest in terminal patients who have made arrangements for cryopreservation. Platt resigned his jobs with the company at the end of 2006. He continued to design and build prototypes of rapid cooling equipment for the company until 2010, and coauthored a pending patent (application number 20110040359, dated February 2011). His final work on a device that could cool patients after cardiac arrest, with potential applications in conventional medicine, was completed for a California laboratory in 2011. It employs a breathable perfluorocarbon liquid and uses the lungs as a heat exchanger in a process known as partial liquid ventilation (see liquid breathing).

== Selected bibliography ==
=== Fiction ===
==== Novels and novellas ====
- Garbage World (1967)
- The Gas (1970)
- The City Dwellers (1970)
- Planet of the Voles (1971)
- Twilight of the City (1978)
- Less Than Human (1986)
- Aton/Worlds of Chthon series (continuation of the series originally by Piers Anthony)
  - 3 Plasm (1987)
  - 4 Soma (1988)
- Free Zone (1988)
- The Silicon Man (1991)
- Protektor (1996)

==== Short stories ====
- One of Those Days (1964)
- Lone Zone (1965)
- The Disaster Story (1966)
- The Failures (1966)
- The Rodent Laboratory (1966)
- Direction (1969)
- A Cleansing of the System (1972)
- The Coldness (1973)
- The New York Times (1973)

==== Anthologies edited ====
- New Worlds Quarterly an anthology series related to New Worlds magazine
  - New Worlds 6 (UK, 1973) with Michael Moorcock
    - This also appeared as New Worlds #5 (US, 1974) with Michael Moorcock
  - New Worlds 7 (UK, 1974) with Hilary Bailey
    - This also appeared as New Worlds #6 (US, 1975) with Hilary Bailey

=== Nonfiction ===
- Dream Makers series
  - 1 Dream Makers: The Uncommon People Who Write Science Fiction (1980)
  - 2 Dream Makers, Volume II: The Uncommon Men & Women Who Write Science Fiction (1983)
  - Dream Makers: Science Fiction and Fantasy Writers at Work (1987)
- Micromania: The Whole Truth About Home Computers (1984)
- Graphics Guide to the Commodore 64 (1984) Sybex Computer Books ISBN 0-89588-138-1
- How to be a Happy Cat (1986) with Gray Joliffe
- Loose Canon (2001)
- Make: Electronics: Learning by Discovery (2009)
- Encyclopedia of Electronic Components Volume 1 (2012)
- Encyclopedia of Electronic Components Volume 2 (2014)
- Make: More Electronics (2014)
- Make: Electronics: Learning by Discovery 2nd Edition (2015)
- Encyclopedia of Electronic Components Volume 3 (2016)
- Make: Tools (2016)
- Easy Electronics (2017)
- Make: Electronics: Learning by Discovery 3rd Edition (2021)
