= Indigo Som =

American poet

Indigo Som (born 1966) is an American photographer, visual artist, poet, feminist, and social activist.

== Early life ==
Indigo Som was born in 1966 and grew up in Marin County, California. Her parents were architects which allowed her to live an economically advantaged life where she attended private schools. Since Som lived in an area of high socioeconomic status, she grew up in a predominantly Caucasian neighborhood, which would influence her artworks in the future. Som attended Brown University from 1984 to 1986 where she then attended California College of the Arts in San Francisco for a year. In 1989, she graduated from the University of California at Berkeley with a B.A. in Ethnic Studies.

== Career ==
Som was very active in bisexual politics during the 1990s. She began her career by publishing poetry at the age of 25 where her earliest works are part of the collection Piece of My Heart: A Lesbian of Colour Anthology.

During the mid-1990s, Som began her career in photography and visual arts. Some of her most famous works include her Gingham Series (1998–99) and Chinese Restaurants of the South (2004–05), which show photographs of rural Chinese restaurants in the American South which has been featured on the LA Times. Her works often question issues of identity and authenticity.

Som's gingham project was inspired by her preppy school uniform that was made out of the material. In the project, she deconstructed the grid-patterned fabric into monotone squares and stripes. In a related installation, Pastel Diaspora (1999–2003) she describes her gingham uniform as "a personal symbol of my adolescent trials as a nerdy Chinese girl among sophisticated white debutantes."

For several years, Som had the idea of exploring Chinese restaurants throughout the country, however, it was difficult for her to find all the Chinese restaurants within a state. In the year 2002, she resurrected the idea and was able to do a simple search on her computer to find all the locations of the Chinese restaurants. A common theme found within her works is that she likes to work with things that everyone knows, but doesn't realize that they know. For example, in her Chinese restaurant project, she understands that many people drive by these small restaurants, but they do not question its belonging. However, these restaurants are a representation of Chinese diaspora within the United States. "The restaurants that are out there, away from here, are kind of a metaphor for my own experience of growing up in Marin," she said. "So there's a whole emotional side of it for me."

== Solo exhibitions ==
- Mostly Mississippi: Chinese Restaurant Pictures from the South. Chinese Historical Society of America, San Francisco CA. Catalog. 2005.
- Chinese Restaurant Pictures. Mills College Art Museum, Oakland CA. 2003.
- Pastel Diaspora. Ampersand International Arts, San Francisco CA. 2003.
- Supply. Sonoma Museum of Visual Art, Santa Rosa CA. 2001.
- Introductions. Braunstein/Quay Gallery, San Francisco CA. 1999.
- American American: Indigo Som/Donna Keiko Ozawa. Crucible Steel Gallery at CELLspace, San Francisco CA. 1999.
- fixations/collections/crushes. Women's Studio Workshop, Rosendale NY. 1997.

== Group exhibitions ==
- Present Tense Biennial: Chinese Character. Chinese Culture Center, San Francisco CA. Catalog. 2009.
- Road Trip. San Jose Museum of Art, San Jose CA. 2008.
- One Way or Another: Asian American Art Now. Asia Society, New York NY. Catalog. 2006. Travels 2007–08 to: Blaffer Art Gallery, Univ. of Houston, TX; *Berkeley Art Museum, Berkeley CA; Japanese American National Museum, Los Angeles CA; Honolulu Academy of Arts, Honolulu, HI.
- Drawn In: Drawing in Residence Phase III. Torrance Art Museum, Torrance CA. 2007.
- Pirated: A Post-Asian Perspective. Kearny Street Workshop, San Francisco CA. Catalog. 2005.
