= Patrick K. Kroupa =

American writer, hacker and activist (born 1969)

Patrick Karel Kroupa
- Born: January 20, 1969 (age 57); Los Angeles, California, U.S.
- Other name: Lord Digital
- Citizenship: American
- Years active: 1983–present
- Known for: MindVox, ibogaine, hacking

Patrick Karel Kroupa (born January 20, 1969), known colloquially as Lord Digital, is an American writer, hacker, and activist. Kroupa was a member of the Legion of Doom and Cult of the Dead Cow hacker groups and co-founded MindVox in 1991 with Bruce Fancher.

== Early years ==
Kroupa was born in Los Angeles, California, on January 20, 1969. His Czech parents left Prague, Czechoslovakia, after the Soviet invasion in 1968 and divorced when Kroupa was six. He then moved to New York City, where he was raised by his mother. He is the nephew of Czech opera singer Zdeněk Kroupa.

Kroupa was part of the first generation to grow up with home computers and network access. In numerous interviews he has repeatedly listed two events which were important in shaping the course of his later years.

The first was being exposed to one of the first two Cray supercomputers that were ever built, which was located at the National Center for Atmospheric Research (NCAR) where his father was a physicist, who took him through the labs and taught him to program in Fortran and feed the Cray using punched cards. This happened during the same year that Woody Allen was filming Sleeper, using NCAR in many of the futuristic background scenes that appeared in the movie. Kroupa got an Apple II computer for his personal use around the time he was seven or eight years old.

The second event that shaped his life was being part of the last days of Abbie Hoffman's YIPL/TAP (Youth International Party Lines/Technological Assistance Program) counter-culture/Yippie meetings that were taking place in New York City's Lower East Side, during the early 1980s. Kroupa again lists this event, repeatedly in interviews, as opening many new doors for him and changing his perceptions about technology.

TAP was the original hacker and phone phreak publication which predated 2600 by decades (at the time of the last TAP meetings, 2600 magazine was just starting to publish its first issues). Kroupa met many people there who would become part of his life in the years to come. Three of the main characters would be his future partner and lifelong friend, Bruce Fancher; Yippie/Medical Marijuana activist Dana Beal (The Theoretician), who was part of the John Draper (Cap'n Crunch) /Abbie Hoffman, technologically inclined branch of the counter-culture and perhaps most important: Herbert Huncke, who introduced Kroupa to heroin at age 14.

With the exception of the counter-cultural and hard-drug elements, the preceding history made Kroupa part of a small group, composed of a few hundred kids who were either wealthy enough to afford home computers in the late 1970s, or had technologically savvy families who understood the potentials of what the machines could do. The Internet as it is today did not exist; only a small percentage of the population had home computers and out of those who did, even fewer had online access through the use of modems.

During his time in the computer underground Kroupa was a member of the first Pirate/Cracking crew to ever exist for the Apple II computer: The Apple Mafia and various phreaking/hacking groups, including Knights of Shadow (KOS). When KOS fell apart after a series of arrests, many of the surviving members were absorbed into Kroupa's final group affiliation: the Legion of Doom (LoD/H).

Kroupa started publishing some of his hacking techniques when he would have been around 12 or 13. There is a significant progression through years of text, which captures Kroupa's early evolution and skills, culminating in an extensive, programmable phone phreaking and hacking tools it for the Apple II computer, called Phantom Access (which is where the name Phantom Access Technologies, the parent corporation behind MindVox, would later come from).

== The MindVox Years ==
=== Voices in my Head (1991–1996) ===
         /\_-\
        <((_))>
         \- \/
 /\_-\(:::::::::)/\_-\
<((_))  MindVox  ((_))>
 \- \/(:::::::::)\- \/
         /\_-\
        <((_))>
         \- \/

In the late 1980s and early 1990s, the computer underground had suffered through a series of protracted raids by the Secret Service and FBI, called Operation Sundevil and Operation Redux. Many Legion of Doom members were raided and charged. This happened against the backdrop of the first and largest gang war that ever took place in cyberspace, the Great Hacker War between LOD and their rival gang MOD (Masters of Deception).

Considering Kroupa and Fancher's backgrounds and the fact that MindVox employed a motley collection of convicted felons, including security expert Len Rose and the infamous Phiber Optik (Mark Abene) who was awaiting a Manhattan grand jury indictment, these were very real issues at the time.

This is the environment in which Patrick Kroupa and Bruce Fancher launched MindVox. In the words of Bruce Fancher:

Our greatest fear wasn't whether or not we'd be successful as a company, that was secondary. What concerned us was that one day the Secret Service would kick in the door and just confiscate everything.

This is also the time during which Patrick Kroupa wrote, Voices in my Head, MindVox: The Overture. Kroupa wrote about the cultural forces that were at play in the hacker underground during the decade that pre-dated the launch of MindVox, considered by some the "Golden Age" of cyberspace.

In the process of writing and releasing Voices, Patrick Kroupa stepped out from behind Lord Digital. Instead of status in the hacker underground and notoriety in a sub-culture, Kroupa was being written about as the Jim Morrison of cyberspace and receiving accolades from the mainstream press.

Voices helped define what MindVox became, a service that received full-length features in magazines and newspapers such as Rolling Stone, Forbes, The Wall Street Journal, The New York Times and The New Yorker. Voices in my Head was the spark that propelled Kroupa out of obscurity and into the mainstream.

An article discusses this is Sassy magazine's coverage of MindVox. What began in the hacker underground, had landed in the middle of a glossy mainstream magazine targeted at an audience of teenage girls, with Kroupa and Fancher displacing that issue's "Cute boy band alert!" with the "Cute cyberpunk alert!".

=== MIA / DOA (1996–2000) ===
He was a vocal proponent of self-selecting one's own state of consciousness and freely wrote and talked about his own drug history. The caveat being, some of his drug use was open and public. He was an advocate of LSD and other psychedelic drugs.

By 1996, MindVox was at the absolute height of its powers, yet it was disintegrating. Bruce Fancher was suddenly part of two or three other start-ups, and system repairs that should have taken hours dragged on for weeks. While the user-base kept growing, the previously high level of intelligent discourse within the internal conferences had suffered, and while MindVox was getting more press than ever, all of it read like the same story being retold for the umpteenth time.

Sometime in early-to-mid 1996, Kroupa simply vanished. Freedom of choice gave way to the downward spiral of hardcore heroin addiction and dysfunction. In his 2005 book, Hip: The History, New York Times reporter and former Details editor John Leland would write:

In truth far too many of the celebrated figures in these pages led melancholy and difficult lives of isolation, mental illness and drug addiction. Interesting and romantic to read about, but very tough on those who live them.

Kroupa's exact whereabouts and activities from early 1996 until December 1999 remain unknown. He has acknowledged that he travelled throughout North America and spent time living in Mexico, Belize, Puerto Rico, the Czech Republic and eventually Bangkok, Thailand.

The dot.com success story that began with MindVox eventually hit rock bottom when Patrick Kroupa turned thirty incarcerated, "doin' Cold turkey on cement, in The Tombs". Several months after this arrest, Kroupa finally kicked heroin through the use of the hallucinogenic drug, ibogaine. He was detoxed for the last time in the West Indies, on the Caribbean island of St. Kitts by Dr. Deborah Mash in late 1999.

He subsequently spent four months living at the Buddhist temple, Wat Tham Krabok, well known for its heroin and opium drug rehabilitation program.

== 21st century ==
A heroin-free Kroupa returned to the United States from Thailand in 2000, and became CTO of Dr. Deborah Mash's Ibogaine Research Project at the University of Miami's Miller School of Medicine.

Over the next several years, Kroupa appeared in a series of ibogaine-related news reports which aired on television, radio and print media. The most famous example probably being San Francisco's KRON news-report, which aired in 2004 and features Kroupa and Mash in a ten-minute long pro-ibogaine story.

Kroupa is regularly a featured speaker at psychedelics and harm reduction conferences. He seems to have a penchant for appearing at speaking engagements with multiple cups of coffee lined up in front of him, sometimes chain-smoking cigarettes through hour-long presentations.

=== Yippies and the counterculture ===
While Kroupa's past history with the Yippies began at around age 13 or 14, when the Yippies formalized a Yippie Speakers Bureau in 2003, consisting of: Paul Krassner, Dana Beal, Robert Altman, Grace Slick, Stew Albert, Dennis Peron, Ed Rosenthal, Jack Hoffman, Steve Conliff and Hunter S. Thompson, and went on tour during 2003–2004, the line-up featured the surprising inclusion of former Black Panther Party leader Dhoruba bin Wahad, and Patrick Kroupa, who wasn't born when the Yippies first became a cultural force in the United States, and was 2–3 generations younger than his closest compatriot. It is unknown whether the YSB remains active; it went on hiatus after the deaths of Stew Albert, Hunter S. Thompson (both in 2005), and Steve Conliff (2006).

On November 15, 2007, he spoke at the University Philosophical Society (Trinity College, Dublin), discussing ibogaine, the worldwide war on drugs, and advocating the legalisation of all narcotics. The following Monday (November 19, 2007) Kroupa appeared on Ireland's national television station TV3's Ireland AM talk show, calling the war on drugs:

... an unequivocal, catastrophic, world-wide failure, that has destroyed countless lives, set fire to hundreds of billions of dollars and produced no discernible results. There is no lack of drugs, basically, anywhere on planet Earth. The number of people using drugs has not decreased. While the street price of drugs hasn't gone up, the purity levels have steadily risen. But hey, we sure do have a lot of people in prison!

Kroupa is High Priest in the Eastern European based Sacrament of Transition (a religious organization whose initiation rituals involve the sacramental use of ibogaine), and a member of Cult of the Dead Cow.

== Bibliography ==
=== Essays ===
- Voices In My Head MindVox: The Overture (1992), Patrick K. Kroupa. ,,

=== Magazines ===
- The Akashic Records of Cyberspace (1993), Patrick K. Kroupa. Mondo 2000.
- Memoirs of a Cybernaut (1993), Patrick K. Kroupa. Wired.
- Agr1pPa - A Book of The Mentally Disturbed (1993), Patrick K. Kroupa. Mondo 2000. [http://project.cyberpunk.ru/idb/agr1ppa.html
- The Secret Service is Neither (1994), Patrick K. Kroupa. Mondo 2000.
- Heroin Times: Ibogaine Series (2000–2003), Patrick K. Kroupa. Heroin Times.

=== Medical journals ===
- Ibogaine: Treatment Outcomes and Observations (2003), Hattie Wells (Epoptica) & Patrick K. Kroupa (Junk the Magic Dragon), MAPS (Multidisciplinary Association for Psychedelic Studies, Volume XIII, Number 2).
- Ibogaine in the 21st Century: Boosters, Tune-ups and Maintenance (2005), Patrick K. Kroupa & Hattie Wells. MAPS (Multidisciplinary Association for Psychedelic Studies, Volume XV, Number 1).
