= Darknet Diaries =

Investigative podcast by Jack Rhysider

- Genre: True crime; cybercrime; technology

Cast and voices
- Hosted by: Jack Rhysider

Music
- Theme music composed by: Breakmaster Cylinder

Production
- Editing: Tristan Ledger; Proximity Sound
- Length: 30–110 minutes

Technical specifications
- Audio format: MP3

Publication
- No. of episodes: 182
- Original release: September 1, 2017
- Updates: First Tuesday of the month

Related
- Website: darknetdiaries.com

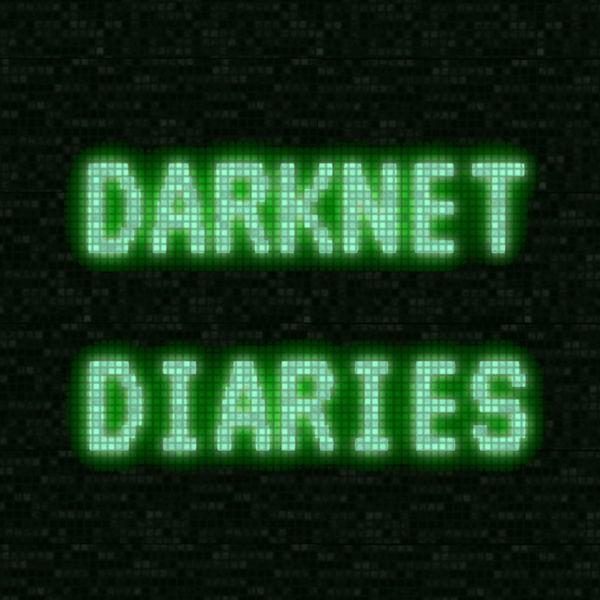
The original Darknet Diaries logo, which was replaced by the current flaming laptop logo in 2019.

Darknet Diaries is an investigative podcast created by Jack Rhysider (/riːˈsaɪdər/), chronicling true stories about crackers, malware, botnets, cryptography, cryptocurrency, cybercrime, and Internet privacy, all subjects falling under the umbrella of "tales from the dark side of the Internet".

Launched in October 2017, episodes average around 30 minutes to an hour, each covering a single topic through original interviews, audio footage, and Rhysider's narration. The show's journalistic style has received widespread acclaim.

== Production ==
For the first 40 episodes, Rhysider was responsible for all of the research, writing, narrating, editing, sound design, publishing, marketing, and logistics. Later on, due to a passionate cult following, Rhysider was able to enlist the help of additional writers, researchers, editors, and graphic designers.

By December 31, 2018, Darknet Diaries had amassed more than 1.2 million downloads. In 2019 alone, it had more than 8.2 million downloads.

=== Impact and real-life influences ===
Episode 17 ("Finn") was adapted and featured on the WNYC Studios podcast Snap Judgment.

Episode 32 ("The Carder") uncovered information about the criminal actions and subsequent investigation of Roman Seleznev.

Episode 27 ("Chartbreakers") was highlighted for its investigation into the manipulation of the Apple Podcasts Top Charts through a vast industry termed as "dark podcast marketing". Rhysider received and then subsequently released photos of the promoters themselves.

=== Crossovers and appearances ===
Rhysider has made appearances on a variety of other programs, the most notable being Snap Judgment and the Lit Hub/Podglomerate Storybound.

Other podcast appearances include Smashing Security, The Many Hats Club, Brakeing Down Security, The Word From Mouth, InfoSec ICU, The Cyberwire, Podcast Business Journal Spotlight, Overnight America, Aidan Wheller Podcast and Audio Reviews, Getting into InfoSec, Grimerica, Cyber Speaks Live, and Chartable Radio.

== Episodes ==
No.	Title	Subject(s)	Guest(s)	Duration	Release date
1	The Phreaky World of PBX Hacking			0:14:01	September 1, 2017
2	The Peculiar Case of the VTech Hacker	VTech: 2015 data breach		0:23:20	September 15, 2017
3	DigiNotar, You are the Weakest Link, Good Bye!	DigiNotar	Gervase Markham	0:25:44	October 10, 2017
4	Panic! at the TalkTalk Board Room	2015 TalkTalk data breach; Carphone Warehouse: Data protection issues		0:38:23	October 15, 2017
5	#ASUSGATE	Asus § AiCloud security vulnerability	Kyle Lovett	0:25:07	November 1, 2017
6	The Beirut Bank Job			0:29:19	November 15, 2017
7	Manfred (Part 1)	Cheating in online games		0:23:16	December 1, 2017
8	Manfred (Part 2)	Cheating in online games		0:28:08	December 1, 2017
9	The Rise and Fall of Mt. Gox	Mt. Gox; Jed McCaleb; Mark Karpelès		0:28:53	December 15, 2017
10	Misadventures of a Nation State Actor			0:33:25	January 1, 2018
11	Strictly Confidential			0:19:32	January 15, 2018
12	Crypto Wars	Crypto Wars	Cindy Cohn	0:28:30	February 1, 2018
13	Carna Botnet	Carna botnet		0:33:18	February 15, 2018
14	#OpJustina		Lou Pelletier	0:25:21	March 1, 2018
15	Ill Tills			0:33:21	April 1, 2018
16	Eijah	AACS encryption key controversy		0:35:40	May 1, 2018
17	Finn			0:45:19	June 3, 2018
18	Jackpot			0:21:05	July 1, 2018
19	Aurora	Operation Aurora		0:30:29	August 1, 2018
20	mobman	Sub7	mobman	0:46:23	August 15, 2018
21	Black Duck Eggs			0:28:19	September 1, 2018
22	Mini-Stories: Vol 1			0:39:41	September 15, 2018
23	Vladimir Levin	Vladimir Levin (hacker)		0:28:22	October 1, 2018
24	Operation Bayonet	Operation Bayonet; AlphaBay; Hansa		0:39:12	October 15, 2018
25	Alberto		Alberto Hill	0:42:35	November 1, 2018
26	IRS	Disclosure of information and theft of $50 million from the IRS		0:35:21	November 15, 2018
27	Chartbreakers	Manipulation of Apple Podcasts rankings		0:47:14	December 1, 2018
28	Unit 8200	Unit 8200		0:48:35	December 15, 2018
29	Stuxnet	Stuxnet	Kim Zetter	0:41:06	January 8, 2019
30	Shamoon	Shamoon		0:35:21	January 22, 2019
31	Hacker Giraffe			0:56:02	February 5, 2019
32	The Carder	Roman Seleznev		0:39:29	February 19, 2019
33	RockYou	RockYou 2009 data breach		0:40:33	March 5, 2019
34	For Your Eyes Only			0:51:54	March 19, 2019
35	Carbanak	Carbanak		0:40:14	April 2, 2019
36	Jeremy from Marketing			1:01:14	April 16, 2019
37	LVS			0:28:23	April 30, 2019
38	Dark Caracal			0:54:44	May 14, 2019
39	3 Alarm Lamp Scooter			0:50:24	May 28, 2019
40	No Parking			1:00:28	June 11, 2019
41	Just Visiting			0:49:16	June 25, 2019
42	Mini-Stories: Vol 2			0:54:15	July 9, 2019
43	PPP			1:00:51	July 23, 2019
44	Zain	Zain Qaiser; FBI MoneyPak Ransomware		0:34:46	August 6, 2019
45	Xbox Underground (Part 1)	Xbox Underground		1:19:19	August 20, 2019
46	Xbox Underground (Part 2)	Xbox Underground		1:22:29	September 3, 2019
47	Project Raven	Project Raven		1:01:49	September 17, 2019
48	Operation Socialist	Operation Socialist; Regin; Quantum insert		0:48:40	October 1, 2019
49	Elliot	Elliot Alderson		0:47:17	October 15, 2019
50	Operation Glowing Symphony			1:11:10	October 29, 2019
51	The Indo-Pak Conflict			0:46:49	November 12, 2019
52	Magecart	Web skimming: Magecart; 2018 British Airways cyberattack		0:48:05	November 26, 2019
53	Shadow Brokers	The Shadow Brokers	Jake Williams	0:50:04	December 10, 2019
54	NotPetya	Petya (malware)	Andy Greenberg	0:57:01	December 24, 2019
55	Noirnet			0:17:37	December 25, 2019
56	Jordan		Jordan Harbinger	0:44:10	January 7, 2020
57	MS08-067	Conficker	John Lambert	0:58:32	January 21, 2020
58	OxyMonster	Dream Market: Opioid epidemic in the United States; Fentanyl		1:00:42	February 4, 2020
59	The Courthouse			1:20:52	February 18, 2020
60	dawgyg			0:43:08	March 3, 2020
61	Samy	Samy Kamkar; Samy (computer worm); Evercookie; SkyJack		1:01:11	March 17, 2020
62	Cam			1:01:56	March 31, 2020
63	w0rmer		Higinio Ochoa, also known as w0rmer	0:56:55	April 14, 2020
64	The Athens Shadow Games	Greek wiretapping case 2004–05; Kostas Tsalikidis		1:14:44	April 28, 2020
65	PSYOP	Psychological warfare	Jon Nichols	1:13:55	May 12, 2020
66	freakyclown			0:53:47	May 26, 2020
67	The Big House			0:40:54	June 9, 2020
68	Triton	Triton (malware)	Julian Gutmanis, Naser Aldossary, Marina Krotofil, Robert M. Lee	1:11:48	June 23, 2020
69	Human Hacker	Social engineering	Christopher Hadnagy	1:04:50	July 6, 2020
70	Ghost Exodus			0:56:45	July 21, 2020
71	Information Monopoly (formerly called FDFF)		Yeonmi Park, Alex Gladstein	1:08:16	August 2, 2020
72	Bangladesh Bank Heist	Bangladesh Bank robbery		0:36:47	August 16, 2020
73	WannaCry	WannaCry ransomware attack	John Hultquist, Matt Suiche	0:44:51	September 1, 2020
74	Mikko		Mikko Hyppönen of F-Secure	1:09:28	September 15, 2020
75	Compromised Comms		Jenna McLaughlin, Zach Dorfman	0:35:07	September 29, 2020
76	Knaves Out	2014 JPMorgan Chase data breach		1:25:10	October 13, 2020
77	Olympic Destroyer	2018 Winter Olympics hack	Andy Greenberg	0:47:02	October 27, 2020
78	Nerdcore	Nerdcore	YTCracker, Ohm-I, and Dual Core	1:18:08	November 10, 2020
79	Dark Basin	Citizen Lab; Dark Basin	Matthew Earl, John Scott-Railton, Adam Hulcoop	0:56:18	November 24, 2020
80	The Whistleblower			0:50:10	December 8, 2020
81	The Vendor			1:17:59	December 22, 2020
82	Master of Pwn	Pwn2Own		1:05:09	January 5, 2021
83	NSA Cryptologists		Marcus J. Carey, Jeff Man	1:22:56	January 19, 2021
84	Jet-setters			1:12:20	February 2, 2021
85	Cam the Carder		Cam Harrison, also known as "kilobit"	1:16:34	February 16, 2021
86	The LinkedIn Incident	2012 LinkedIn Hack		0:55:00	March 2, 2021
87	Guild of the Grumpy Old Hackers			0:50:30	March 16, 2021
88	Victor			0:42:43	March 30, 2021
89	Cybereason: Molerats in the Cloud	Cybereason		0:57:35	April 6, 2021
90	Jenny		Jenny Radcliffe	1:11:29	April 13, 2021
91	webjedi		Amélie Koran, also known as webjedi	0:58:57	April 27, 2021
92	The Pirate Bay	The Pirate Bay, The Pirate Bay trial	Peter Sunde	1:46:13	May 11, 2021
93	Kik	CSAM controversy on Kik		1:34:18	May 25, 2021
94	Mariposa Botnet	Mariposa botnet	Chris Davis	0:44:08	June 8, 2021
95	Jon & Brian's Big Adventure			1:16:25	June 22, 2021
96	The Police Station Incident			0:55:39	July 6, 2021
97	The Pizza Problem			0:47:49	July 20, 2021
98	Zero Day Brokers	Market for zero-day exploits	Nicole Perlroth	0:50:13	August 3, 2021
99	The Spy			1:13:44	August 17, 2021
100	NSO	Pegasus, NSO Group		1:12:53	August 31, 2021
101	Lotería	Puerto Rico Lottery		1:12:57	September 28, 2021
102	Money Maker		Frank Bourassa	1:21:52	October 12, 2021
103	Cloud Hopper			0:52:25	October 26, 2021
104	Arya			1:19:41	November 9, 2021
105	Secret Cells		Joseph Cox	1:12:41	November 23, 2021
106	@Tennessee			0:47:39	December 7, 2021
107	Alethe			0:57:18	December 21, 2021
108	Marq			0:48:21	January 11, 2022
109	TEAMPOISON	TeaMp0isoN	MLT	1:00:07	January 25, 2022
110	Spam Botnets	Rustock botnet, Waledac botnet, Cutwail botnet		1:11:39	February 8, 2022
111	ZeuS	Gameover ZeuS		0:48:35	February 22, 2022
112	Dirty Coms			1:31:00	March 8, 2022
113	Adam			0:54:13	March 22, 2022
114	HD	Metasploit	H. D. Moore	1:18:03	April 5, 2022
115	Player Cheater Developer Spy			0:40:42	April 19, 2022
116	Mad Dog			1:15:54	May 3, 2022
117	Daniel the Paladin	2015 TalkTalk data breach	Daniel Kelley (hacker)	1:11:41	May 17, 2022
118	Hot Swaps	SIM swap attack	Joseph Harris	1:28:04	May 31, 2022
119	Hot Wallets		Geoff White	0:57:24	June 14, 2022
120	Voulnet		Mohammed Aldoub, also known as Voulnet	0:32:45	June 28, 2022
121	Ed		Ed Skoudis, Beau Woods	0:41:51	July 26, 2022
122	Lisa		Lisa Forte	0:49:19	August 23, 2022
123	Newswires			0:49:02	September 6, 2022
124	Synthetic Remittance			0:19:50	September 20, 2022
125	Jeremiah		Jeremiah Roe	0:49:14	October 4, 2022
126	REvil	REvil		1:03:53	October 18, 2022
127	Maddie	Project Zero	Maddie Stone	0:54:04	November 1, 2022
128	Gollumfun (Part 1 of 2)	Counterfeit Library, ShadowCrew	Brett Johnson, also known as Gollumfun	1:01:00	November 15, 2022
129	Gollumfun (Part 2 of 2)	Counterfeit Library, ShadowCrew	Brett Johnson, also known as Gollumfun	1:18:48	November 29, 2022
130	Jason's Pen Test		Jason Haddix	0:45:36	December 13, 2022
131	Welcome to Video	Episode about the Welcome to Video case	Andy Greenberg	1:10:08	December 27, 2022
132	Sam the Vendor		Sam Bent, also known as DoingFedTime	1:19:23	April 4, 2023
133	I'm the Real Connor		Connor Tumbleson	0:42:48	May 2, 2023
134	Deviant		Deviant Ollam	1:30:46	June 6, 2023
135	The D.R. Incident		Omar Avilez	0:46:02	July 4, 2023
136	Team Xecuter	Team Xecuter	Gary Bowser	1:28:08	August 1, 2023
137	Predator	Predator (spyware) - Episode expands on and relates to the article Flight of the Predator		1:10:46	September 5, 2023
138	The Mimics of Punjab			0:48:18	October 3, 2023
139	D3f4ult			1:21:49	November 7, 2023
140	Revenge Bytes			1:28:52	December 5, 2023
141	The Pig Butcher	Pig butchering scam		0:59:27	January 2, 2024
142	Axact	Axact		0:56:30	February 6, 2024
143	Jim Hates Scams		Jim Browning (YouTuber)	1:09:54	March 5, 2024
144	Rachel		Rachel Tobac	1:05:46	April 2, 2024
145	Shannen		Shannen Rossmiller	1:05:43	May 7, 2024
146	Anom	Operation Trojan Shield	Joseph Cox	1:07:47	June 4, 2024
147	Tornado	Tornado Cash, Axie Infinity		1:15:21	July 2, 2024
148	Dubsnatch			1:32:34	August 6, 2024
149	Mini-Stories: Vol 3			0:51:22	September 3, 2024
150	mobman 2	Episode refers back to Episode 20 (mobman) to revisit the sub7 malware story.		0:46:20	October 1, 2024
151	Chris Rock			1:01:02	November 5, 2024
152	Stacc Attack			0:56:07	December 3, 2024
153	Bike Index	Bicycle theft, Bike Index	Bryan Hance	1:04:19	January 7, 2025
154	Hijacked Line			1:09:58	February 4, 2025
155	Kingpin		Joe Grand, also known as Kingpin	1:12:03	March 4, 2025
156	Kill list			1:06:41	March 18, 2025
157	Grifter			1:21:36	April 1, 2025
158	MalwareTech	WannaCry ransomware attack, Kronos (malware), Arrest and trial of Marcus Hutchins	Marcus Hutchins, also known as MalwareTech	1:06:23	May 6, 2025
159	Vastaamo	Vastaamo data breach	Joe Tidy	0:54:06	June 3, 2025
160	Greg		Greg Linares, also known as Laughing Mantis	1:41:08	July 1, 2025
161	mg			1:15:22	July 15, 2025
162	Hieu		Hieu Minh Ngo	1:37:08	August 5, 2025
163	Ola	Ola Bini § Arrest in Ecuador	Ola Bini	1:26:22	September 2, 2025
164	Oak Cliff Swipers			1:31:28	October 7, 2025
165	Tanya		Tanya Janca	0:47:37	November 4, 2025
166	Maxie		Maxie Reynolds	1:04:53	December 2, 2025
167	Threatlocker	Episode sponsored by Threatlocker.	Hunter Clark, Danny Jenkins	0:49:16	December 23, 2025
168	LoD	First part of a two part story on Legion of Doom.		1:20:58	January 6, 2026
169	MoD	Masters of Deception (MoD)		1:09:47	January 20, 2026
170	Phrack	Phrack magazine		0:48:34	February 3, 2026
171	Melody Fraud			1:13:01	March 3, 2026
172	Superbox	SuperBox	D3ada55	1:31:04	April 7, 2026
173	Tarjeteros			0:41:25	April 21, 2026
174	Pacific Rim	Sophos § Pacific Rim	Andrew Brandt, Craig Jones	1:34:07	May 5, 2026
175	Bayrob			1:39:49	June 2, 2026
176	NSL	National security letters, American Civil Liberties Union v. Ashcroft	Nicholas Merrill, Cindy Cohn	1:09:56	July 7, 2026
177	National Public Data	2024 National Public Data breach, Identity theft		0:47:42	July 21, 2026
178	Ubiquiti	Ubiquiti § 2021 alleged data breach and lawsuit		0:36:07	August 4, 2026
179	The Courthouse - Revisited	This is a follow up to the events that happened in Episode 59 - The Courthouse. Also worthy of note this episode marks exactly 9 years of Darknet Diaries to the day.		1:38:03	September 1, 2026
180	Conti	Conti (ransomware)	Geoff White, Alex Holden	0:59:09	October 6, 2026
181	Ricky	Account takeover, SIM swap attack, Cryptocurrency and crime	Ricky Handschumacher, Mark Kreitzman	01:23:25	October 20, 2026
182	Blackshades	Blackshades		0:42:30	November 3, 2026

== Reception ==
When describing the show's style and presentation, various media outlets have drawn comparisons between Reply All and This American Life, with The Irish Times writing, "Darknet Diaries is...where storytelling is mixed with investigative techniques to provide a strong narrative with real people at its core." The New York Times wrote, "Though the episodes are often startlingly short, condensing stories into 30 minutes that could easily justify a full hour, Rhysider’s hypnotic narration and deep expertise creates results that are never less than gripping."

The Boston Globe called Darknet Diaries "a true-crime podcast with no blood [and] no bodies...[leaving] you wondering why there aren't more hacks, breaches, and cyber-crime."

Miranda Sawyer of The Observer highlighted the podcast's reported "small disasters" of online life, writing: "Neatly edited and charmingly presented by Jack Rhysider, the podcast does occasionally stray into nerdiness, but it’s chock-full of real-life examples of when our virtual lives fail."

Vulture magazine listed Darknet Diaries among its list of "52 of the Best True-Crime Podcasts", following what they deemed as "the post-Serial boom", citing how "some of these [cybercrimes] may hit a little too close to home" while also advising listeners: "Cover your laptop camera, throw that iPhone in the river, and hang out in that weird no-reception corner of your home."

== Awards ==
- Runner-up in the 2018 Discover Pods Award for Best Technology Podcast
- Winner of the 2018 Quartz Casties for Best Technology Episode
- Winner of the 2019 European Security Blogger Awards for Best New Cybersecurity Podcast

== See also ==
- List of American crime podcasts
