= MLT (hacktivist) =

British computer hacker (born 1994)

Matthew "MLT" Telfer
- Born: 1994 (age 31–32); Newcastle upon Tyne, United Kingdom
- Education: Northumbria University
- Years active: 2006 - Present Day
- Known for: Former affiliation with TeaMp0isoN

MLT, real name Matthew Telfer, (born 1994) is a cybersecurity researcher, former grey hat computer hacker and former member of TeaMp0isoN. MLT was arrested in May 2012 in relation to his activities within TeaMp0isoN, a computer-hacking group which claimed responsibility for many high-profile attacks, including website vandalism of the United Nations, Facebook, NATO, BlackBerry, T-Mobile USA and several other large sites in addition to high-profile denial-of-service attacks and leaks of confidential data. After his arrest, he reformed his actions and shifted his focus to activities as a white hat cybersecurity specialist. He was the founder of now-defunct Project Insecurity LTD.

== Biography ==
Believed to be the former co-leader and spokesperson of TeaMp0isoN, MLT, along with Junaid Hussain and other hackers targeted many large websites and corporations over a two-year period, from 2010 up until 2012 when both individuals were arrested. The group first gained popularity after targeting infamous hacking collective LulzSec, releasing personal information on their members and purporting to have hacked their websites, they then went on to target sites such as NATO, and various government officials from the United Kingdom and United States of America . The arrests finally came as a result of the probe into the alleged hacking and wiretapping of the British Security Services Anti-Terrorism Hotline.

MLT was the former hacking partner of Junaid Hussain, who later went on to join ISIS and was killed in a drone strike by the US Government after becoming the third highest target on their 'kill list' due to his role in inspiring international lone-wolf terrorism alongside his hacking activities for ISIS under the banner of Islamic State Hacking Division. It was reported by Vice that Junaid Hussain remained in contact with MLT while in Syria, and that he used to occasionally ask for advice relating to hacking or would sometimes even openly boast about his activities within ISIS to MLT.

=== Arrest ===
On 9 May 2012, MLT was arrested in Newcastle upon Tyne by the Metropolitan Police who released a statement saying: "The suspect, who is believed to use the online 'nic' 'MLT', is allegedly a member of and spokesperson for TeaMp0isoN ('TeamPoison')--a group which has claimed responsibility for more than 1,400 offences including denial of service and network intrusions where personal and private information has been illegally extracted from victims in the U.K. and around the world".

It was reported that MLT could have faced up to 10 years in prison for the events leading to his arrest.

=== Later activity ===
In May 2015, someone purporting to be MLT featured on CNN, speaking to them about Junaid Hussain and claiming that he witnessed him appear on video chat once as a 'black power ranger' while wielding an AK-47. In August 2015, MLT featured on Episode 5 of the TV show Viceland Cyberwar where he spoke about subjects ranging from the security of autonomous cars to the death of his former hacking partner.

In 2016, Matthew identified and reported vulnerabilities to eBay and the U.S. Department of Defense. He has stated that he avoids illegal activities and instead dedicates his time to participating in bug bounty programs.

In 2022, MLT appeared as a guest on Darknet Diaries. In this episode the history of TeaMp0isoN and some of the high profile hacks that MLT undertook are discussed, as well as the relationship between MLT and Junaid Hussain.

Currently MLT works as a bug bounty hunter as well as a zero-day exploit developer. He also operates a private exploit research and development team named "Bug0xF4" (pronounced "BugHalt").

=== Project Insecurity ===
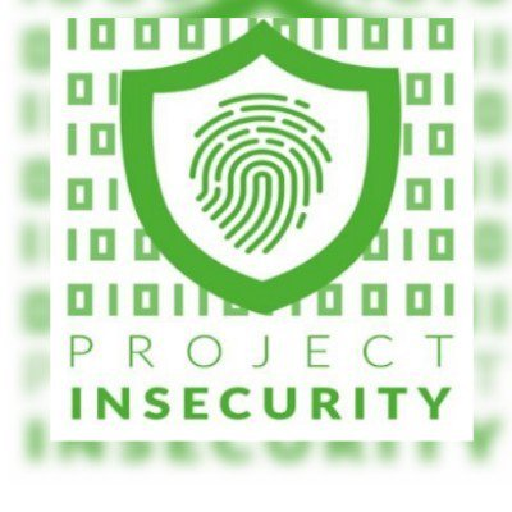
Logo of the project

Project Insecurity was a computer security organization founded in 2018 Teifer, focusing on educational resources, vulnerability identification and remediation, and exploit development.

In April 2018, Project Insecurity released two exploits affecting live chat systems used by various Internet Service Providers and Financial corporations around the world. Nuance Communications and LiveChat were the affected software vendors, both of which appeared to be vulnerable to bugs of a similar nature. These bugs could have allowed a malicious actor to glean information on employees relating to the affected companies, such as the name, email, and employee ID of the chat agent, alongside other information such as the backend systems in use, allowing a malicious hacker to potentially gain a foothold within these networks. One of the founders of this exploit was Kane Gamble, who was convicted and given a two-year prison sentence shortly after these exploits were disclosed. Kane's sentencing was unrelated to any activities involving Project Insecurity and was instead due to his involvement with Crackas With Attitude, a group responsible for purportedly hacking the CIA, FBI and Department of Homeland Security. Prior to his sentencing, Kane Gamble had been attempting to show that he had reformed his character, not only working alongside Project Insecurity to help secure the above affected systems, but also by reporting vulnerabilities to companies such as T-Mobile USA of his own accord.

In August 2018, Project Insecurity released a series of critical exploits for OpenEMR, an electronic medical system. There was over 25 vulnerabilities released in total, some of which would allow a malicious hacker to obtain full access to any machine running OpenEMR. This meant that such a flaw could be leveraged to expose the personal information of more than 100 million people worldwide, including 30-million US Citizens.
