= Sakura Samurai =

Sakura Samurai may refer to:

- Sakura Samurai: Art of the Sword, a 2011 video game
- Sakura Samurai (group), a group of white hat hackers
