= Junaid Hussain =

ISIL propagandist and hacker (1994–2015)

- Born: c. 1994; Birmingham, UK
- Died: 25 August 2015 (aged 21); Raqqa, Syria
- Cause of death: Drone strike
- Other name: Abu Hussain al-Britani
- Citizenship: United Kingdom; Pakistani
- Occupation: Hacker
- Spouse: Sally-Anne Jones (?-2015)
- Children: 1

Junaid Hussain (c. 1994 – 25 August 2015) was a British black hat hacker and propagandist under the nom de guerre of Abu Hussain al-Britani (Note: Arabic: أبو حسين البريطاني) who supported the Islamic State (IS). Hussain, who was raised in Birmingham in a family originally from Pakistan, was jailed in 2012 for hacking Tony Blair's accounts and posting his personal information online. Hussain left the UK around 2013 for Syria.

Hussain was killed in 2015 via airstrike.

== Hacking and propagandizing ==
Hussain was known as TriCk from the disbanded hacking group TeaMp0isoN. He was a key figure in a group of Islamist computer hackers who call themselves the Cyber Caliphate. The Islamist hackers were involved in defacing French websites during the 2015 Île-de-France attacks and the Twitter feeds of the U.S. Central Command, Newsweek and the International Business Times. The group is believed to have been behind the use of a spearphishing attack that exposed identities of rebel media groups.

In March 2015, Hussain released a list of U.S. military personnel requesting that IS followers execute people on the list. While Hussain claimed to have breached US Department of Defense servers, the FBI assessed that the list was cobbled together from news articles, social media posts, and public records.

Hussain was in online contact with one of the gunmen behind the Curtis Culwell Center attack of May 2015. Before the incident, an attacker posted online statements on Twitter, in which he requested others to follow Hussain's account. After the shooting occurred, Hussain wrote: "Allahu Akbar!!!! 2 of our brothers just opened fire."

== Attempts on life and death ==
An attempted lethal drone strike on Hussain, around ten days before his death, instead killed three civilians and injured five.

The Sunday Times reported that US officials intended to assassinate Hussain, listing him as the third highest IS target on the Pentagon's "kill list", behind Abu Bakr al-Baghdadi and Mohammed Emwazi, due to his role in inspiring international lone wolf terrorism.

US government sources reported Hussain, along with two of his bodyguards, was killed in a drone strike on a car at a petrol station in Raqqa, the Islamic State's Syrian capital, on 24 August 2015. (Note: Because of the international dateline, the date in Iraq time is different from the date in U.S. time. The Pentagon's report noted the drone strike occurred on 24 August while The New York Times reported the strike occurred on 25 August.) Hussain, 21 at the time of his reported death, was married to Sally Jones, 45, a fellow Briton who had joined IS. She denied his death through IS-linked Twitter accounts.

Hussain and his British wife, Sally-Anne Jones, regularly used her son from a prior relationship as a human shield to prevent drone attacks. On the occasion when he was killed, he had ventured out without the child. It was reported that Hussain's location was discovered after he clicked on a compromised Internet link sent by an undercover agent on the Surespot messaging app. Jones later confirmed that Hussain had been killed. As well as Jones and his stepson, Hussain left behind a second wife, a Syrian national he married a few weeks after Jones's arrival in Raqqa in late 2013. Jones and her twelve-year-old son were killed in 2017.
