= Sally-Anne Jones =

British ISIL propagandist (1968–2017)

- Born: Sally-Anne Frances Jones; 17 November 1968; Greenwich, London, England
- Died: 27 May 2017 (aged 48); Mayadin, Deir ez-Zor Governorate, Syria
- Other names: Umm Hussain al-Britani; Sakinah Hussein; the White Widow
- Occupations: Jihad recruiter, musician
- Known for: Joining ISIL with her young child

Sally-Anne Frances Jones (17 November 1968 – c. June 2017), also known as Umm Hussain al-Britani, (Note: Arabic: أم حسين البريطاني) and Sakinah Hussein, (Note: Arabic: سكينه حسين) was a British terrorist, Islamist, and UN-designated recruiter and propagandist for the Islamic State of Iraq and the Levant (ISIL). Known as the "White Widow", her recruitment efforts focused on women from western nations. Jones is thought to have been killed in 2017 by a US drone strike.

== Early life ==
Jones was born in Greenwich, south-east London. She was an only child. Her parents divorced and her father took his own life shortly after, when Jones was 10 years old. Brought up as a Catholic, she participated in Christian youth groups while a teenager, leaving school at 16 and entering employment working for L’Oréal selling cosmetics. A former punk rock guitarist and singer active during the 1990s in an all-female band called Krunch, Jones is reported to have been living on welfare benefits (which she denied) in a council house in Chatham, Kent and to have used a food bank before her departure for Syria. Spending much time on the Internet, she became interested in witchcraft and alternative lifestyles.

== ISIL ==
Jones converted to Islam and left her previous partner claiming, in social media exchanges with Sunday Times journalist Dipesh Gadher, that the Iraq War had converted her (around May 2013) to the ISIL cause. Together with Junaid Hussain, who was in charge of recruiting hackers to ISIL, she recruited and propagandised for the group. Jones travelled to Syria with her younger son in late 2013 to join Hussain, originally from Birmingham, who soon became her husband. She left her other son behind in the UK. In Syria, she took the nom de guerre Sakinah Hussein. A few weeks after Jones's arrival in Syria, her husband took a second wife, a 23-year-old Syrian national, and lived with her and Jones in the same building.

Hussain was killed by a U.S. drone strike on 25 August 2015, After Hussain's death, Jones commented that her husband was killed by "the greatest enemy of Allah". He was "a good role model for my children", Jones told Dipesh Gadher. The following month, Jones was one of four Britons placed on the UN's most-wanted list at the request of the prime minister David Cameron. It was believed to be the first time any country had placed one of its own nationals on a list of ISIL operatives. Responding on Twitter, Jones said she would continue to fight "England...until my last breath".

Jones's activity online was consistent with her role as leader of the secret Anwar al-Awlaki battalion's female wing. In this role, Jones was responsible for training all European female recruits, in the use of weapons and tactics. These muhajirat were then trained and instructed to carry out suicide missions in the West, according to leaked ISIS documents. Despite some reports, according to Kim Sengupta in The Independent, there is no proof of her leading all-female groups of ISIL members into battle.

According to the Counter Extremism Project (CEP), Jones used Twitter to propagandise for ISIL. She is believed to have recruited hundreds of British women to work for ISIS and in 2016 called on female sympathisers in Britain to make terrorist strikes in London, Glasgow, and Wales during Ramadan. American court documents made available in spring 2017 linked Jones and her husband to at least a dozen ISIS plots; many of these either did not take place or were stopped while being put into action. She was involved in publishing three online lists of US military personnel intended as potential targets for jihadists. Jones even specifically targeted the lives of 100 soldiers by posting the personal information of these soldiers online to facilitate locating them. In other tweets, Jones called out specific soldiers by making their names the subject of her tweets. Included in this personal targeting was a Navy Seal who was involved in the killing of Osama bin Laden. By this time, the American military reportedly considered her a "high priority" for assassination.

Jones's most meaningful contribution to the terrorist organization is thought to have been the influence she was able to exert on women globally, specifically western women, to join ISIL. She had said she was "leading a battalion of jihadist women".

== Probable death and aftermath ==
In October 2017, the Daily Mirror reported that Jones had been killed in an American drone strike in June 2017 along with her 12-year-old son. While the mother and son are presumed to have been killed in Raqqa while escaping the drone strike, this has not been confirmed because DNA evidence was never recovered. The pair were believed to be on their way to ISIL-occupied Mayadin. According to Shiraz Maher, Jones is the first woman to have been directly targeted in an airstrike, and one of only two women considered at the time by the United States Department of State as a foreign terrorist combatant.

Jones had decided to raise her younger son as an ISIL child soldier. Her former partner said in August 2016 that their son had participated in a video in which he, along with four other boys, had shot five Kurdish hostages in the back of the head. Jones issued a statement saying the boy was not her son.

Jones and her husband regularly used her son as a human shield to prevent being targeted by drone attacks. The legal case for the killings of the twelve-year-old boy and his mother has been contested because his age means he would be classified as a "non-combatant". According to guidance from the International Committee of the Red Cross (ICRC), Jones may not be considered a member of ISIL (she would be a legitimate target if she was), because she did not carry out a "continuous combat function". Amnesty International said the killing of Jones and her son was of "questionable legality".

Jones's son's reported death was disputed in November 2017 by Syrian sources. However, in January 2018, Dipesh Gadher of The Sunday Times wrote of an "informed source" who had told him "it's 99.9% certain that they were both killed". A member of "The Beatles" terrorist group, Alexanda Kotey, said on ITV News in late May 2019 that Jones and her son had moved from Raqqa to Mayadin in early 2017 before being killed along with around 38 others while inside a government building that was shelled on 25 May 2017, a few days after the Manchester Arena bombing.

== See also ==
- Khadijah Dare
- Amira Karroum
- Samantha Lewthwaite
- Samantha Sally
