= 420chan =

Anonymous forums where users can discuss drugs and alcohol

- Website type: Imageboard
- Founded: 20 April 2005
- Headquarters: Toronto, Ontario, Canada
- Owner: Taima Enterprises
- Creator: Aubrey Cottle (Kirtaner)
- Website: 420chan.org not420chan.org (defunct) not420chan.com (defunct)
- Registration: No
- Current status: offline

420chan was an anonymous imageboard founded on 20 April 2005 (Note: The .org TLD specifies its creation dates in its WHOIS data using ISO 8601 dates. The creation date of 2005-04-21T03:39:16Z specifies that the domain was registered on 21 April 2005, in UTC. However, because Cottle is from Toronto, which in April has time zone UTC−05:00, the registration actually did happen in the final hours of 20 April 2005.) by hacker and freelance web developer Aubrey Cottle. According to its founder, its name was a portmanteau of 420, a slang word originating in cannabis culture but now applicable to drug culture more generally, and 4chan, another imageboard website. Discussion on the site was primarily focused around recreational drug use and wrestling, with other boards related to topics including humour and academia.

While in its early history it was primarily known for hosting a board known as /i/, (Note: As on 4chan, boards are identified by their URLs, which are typically acronyms or shorthand for the full name of the board.) (Note: /i/ — "Invasion".) then used by the hacker collective Anonymous to stage "invasions" against individuals and web platforms such as Habbo Hotel, and Hal Turner.

The modern incarnation of the website was primarily known for hosting discussions about psychoactive drugs legal and illegal. The site was also known for its LGBT discussion boards, /cd/ (Note: /cd/ — "Transgender Discussion".) and /sd/, (Note: /sd/ — "Sexuality Discussion".) as well as the wrestling board, /wooo/.

As of 1 June 2022, 420chan's main URL, 420chan.org, went offline. On 20 April 2023, the domain was sold to Fredrick Brennan for $4,200 in Ethereum, and a temporary landing page went up.
