= Robert Willis (hacker) =

Ethical hacker and publisher of comics

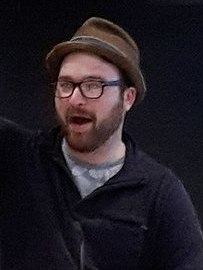
- Willis in 2015
- Other name: rej_ex
- Known for: Hacking, comic books

Robert Willis, also known as rej_ex, is an American hacker and comic book writer. He is known for his work with the Sakura Samurai white-hat hacking group, and his contributions to the Wiley Tribe of Hackers book series. In 2015, he helped build a platform and strategy for news syndication for his client Natural News, a fake news website. The site was ultimately used to promote the candidacy of Donald Trump against Hillary Clinton across hundreds of sister websites; the pieces would reach over 30 million people a week prior to the 2016 election.

== Early life ==
Willis was born in Stamford, Connecticut and raised by his mother and her family, who had immigrated to the United States from Italy.

Willis became interested in computers at a young age, and began working online with hacker groups. He later identified the movies Hackers and The Matrix as contributors to his interest in hacking.

== Career ==
=== Hacking ===
Willis has worked in offensive security and red teaming for the military, later receiving a Texas Medal of Merit for his cybersecurity work. He was also employed for a time at Threatcare, a cyberattack simulation company. As of 2020, Willis was a managing member of 1337, Inc., a defensive cybersecurity company based in Austin, Texas. He is also a member of the Sakura Samurai hacking group. Through his work with Sakura Samurai, Willis has been involved in discovering security issues affecting Indian governmental groups, the Fermilab particle physics laboratory, Ford, and John Deere.

=== Misinformation ===
In October 2021, Willis revealed in an Ars Technica profile that he was "Hacker X", a previously anonymous individual described by Theresa Payton in her 2020 book, Manipulated: Inside the Cyberwar to Hijack Elections and Distort the Truth. Willis described how he had helped build a disinformation network and run a massive fake news operation for Natural News, a website known for anti-vax conspiracies and for promoting then presidential candidate Donald J. Trump. From 2015 to 2017, Willis and Natural News helped promote the candidacy of Trump, spread hoaxes, and published political propaganda.

Willis told Payton that he contacted the for-profit, pro-Trump Macedonian fake news industry to learn their tradecraft, tactics Ars Technica refers to as information warfare. In one example, Willis would choose headlines to manipulate the emotions and psychological state of their readers, often structured around the time of day. When Facebook banned links to Natural News in 2020, investigators revealed that the site had used content farms in North Macedonia and the Philippines. Facebook also discovered that Facebook Groups affiliated with Natural News were administered by people whose locations traced to Macedonia.

Additionally, the Bosnian fact-checking site Raskrinkavanje found that Natural News and Healthy Food House, one of the original Macedonian fake health news content farms that predated the politically oriented content farms by several years, were sharing the same false stories about food.

=== Comic books ===
Willis's first comic series was called Paraneon, which included three titles: The Hive Network, Neon Skyline, and Portals. The books were originally launched as a Kickstarter, eventually raising over 300% of the original funding goal. In 2021, Willis obtained the trademark for Gold Key Comics.

== Political activism ==
Willis was an activist in the Connecticut Tea Party movement starting in 2009, and acted as the head of its 4th Congressional district campaign. He caused a rift internally after threatening to vote Republicans out of office. Willis received the nomination from the Republican Party for State Representative in the 105th District of Connecticut in 2014. In 2021, Willis told Ars Technica that he identifies as socially liberal and fiscally conservative.

== Bibliography ==
=== Cybersecurity ===
- Contributing writer in: Carey, Marcus J.; Jin, Jennifer (2019). Tribe of Hackers: Cybersecurity Advice from the Best Hackers in the World. John Wiley & Sons. doi:10.1002/9781119643395. ISBN 978-1-119-64338-8.
- Contributing writer in: Carey, Marcus J.; Jin, Jennifer (2019). Tribe of Hackers Red Team: Tribal Knowledge from the Best in Offensive Cybersecurity. John Wiley & Sons. doi:10.1002/9781119643357. ISBN 978-1-119-64333-3.
- Contributing writer in: Carey, Marcus J.; Jin, Jennifer (2020). Tribe of Hackers Blue Team: Tribal Knowledge from the Best in Defensive Cybersecurity. John Wiley & Sons. doi:10.1002/9781119643432. ISBN 978-1-119-64342-5.
- "Foreword". in Jackson, John (2021). Jackson, John (ed.). Corporate Cybersecurity: Identifying Risks and the Bug Bounty Program. John Wiley & Sons. doi:10.1002/9781119782568. ISBN 978-1-1197-8252-0.

=== Comics ===
- Neon Skyline (writer, letterer, artist, March 2021)
- The Hive Network (writer, colorist, letterer, artist, March 2021)
- Portals (writer, March 2021)
- Initiating ...Paraneon (writer, colorist, letterer, April 2021)
