= Aubrey Cottle =

Webmaster

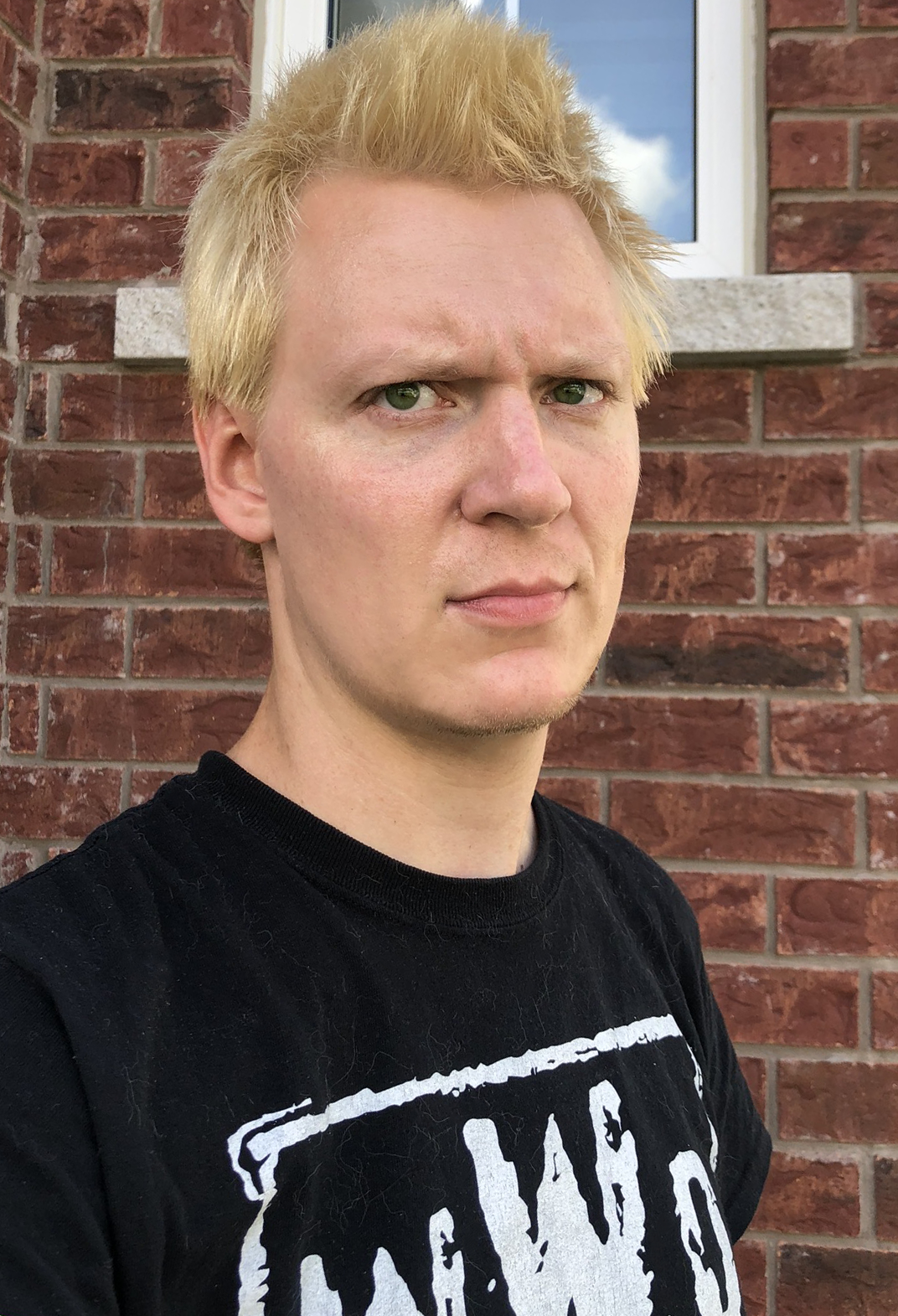
- Born: April 6, 1987 (age 39)
- Other names: Kirtaner, Kirt
- Occupations: Forum administrator, member of hacking group(s)
- Years active: 2008–present
- Known for: Early member of Anonymous; Founder of 420chan
- Website: phisher.io

Aubrey Cottle (born April 6, 1987), also known as Kirtaner or Kirt, is a Canadian website forum administrator who claims to be an early member of the hacktivist group Anonymous. Cottle was involved with Anonymous during the late 2000s and in its resurgence beginning in 2020, in which the group attempted to combat the far-right conspiracy movement QAnon.

Cottle is the founder of the now-defunct forum-image site 420chan and its sister-site Taima.tv, which majorly consisted of imageboards about pro wrestling (where its board was known as "/wooo/", which spawned the /wooo/tube station on Taima.tv), recreational drug use, and LGBT+ and transgender topics.

== History ==
=== Early years ===
Cottle was an active user of 4chan and Something Awful in the mid-2000s, where he and others began collectively referring to themselves as "Anonymous", due to the 4chan moniker of the same name. During this time Anonymous began trolling and "raiding" other websites, online games and chat rooms, as well as black-hat hacking: targeting Hal Turner, The Church of Scientology and others. 4chan ultimately curtailed raiding from their platform, resulting in Cottle and others migrating to Cottle's website 420chan, an imageboard with a focus on drug culture, LGBT discussion, and raiding.

According to Cottle, upon being photographed by Scientologists during the 2008 Project Chanology rally, he began fearing for his family's safety. According to Cottle, he tried unsuccessfully to "shut down" Anonymous after this incident, and so attempted to generate bad press for the group so that they would lose public support. During a 2021 interview with Vice News, he claimed responsibility for the group's 2008 attack on the Epilepsy Foundation's website, where Anonymous members flooded the forum with flashing animations to trigger seizures in those with photosensitive or pattern-sensitive epilepsy. Cottle later expressed remorse for the attack.

Cottle said in a 2021 interview that he retired for "a number of years", and was not continuously involved with Anonymous since its creation. During this period Cottle turned to software engineering contract work.

=== 2020 re-emergence ===
Beginning with a series of arrests in 2009–2011, Anonymous' notoriety began to fade, and by 2018 the group had largely left the public spotlight. However, in 2020 Anonymous re-emerged following the George Floyd protests, performing the June 2020 BlueLeaks breach in which they publicly released a large amount of hacked U.S. law enforcement data. Reuters named Cottle as one of those responsible for the group's presence on Twitter.

In August 2020, Cottle identified himself as a founder of Anonymous in an article by Dale Beran in The Atlantic. Cottle said in a November 2020 Reddit AMA that "right now my only end-goal is bringing the QAnon game to a conclusion". The previous month, he had been one of the anti-QAnon researchers who exposed connections between QAnon figure Jim Watkins and domain names suggesting connections to child pornography.

In November 2020, Cottle was responsible for exploiting security flaws in Parler, a social networking service popular with the right wing, to spoof posts to appear as though they were from a verified account belonging to Ron Watkins. In the posts, Watkins appeared to expose his father, Jim Watkins, as "Q", the anonymous poster at the center of the QAnon conspiracy theory. Around this time, Cottle exposed Parler user data by exploiting a flaw in a third-party vendor, which granted him access to Parler's email newsletter database. In January 2021, Cottle exposed email logs from a company called Is It Wet Yet, which belongs to Jim Watkins and serves as the parent company for 8chan, an imageboard described as the "home" of QAnon. These leaked logs allowed researchers to analyze Watkins's connections with other figures involved with the QAnon conspiracy movement. In August 2021, Cottle and open source intelligence analyst Libby Shaw were among the researchers who exposed the developer behind QAlerts, an app used by QAnon adherents to read posts from the anonymous "Q".

In February 2022, Cottle claimed responsibility for a hack on Christian crowdfunding website GiveSendGo, which was hosting a fundraiser for the Canada convoy protest. The hack released donor's names, personal information, and donation amounts for all the campaigns on the website. After he claimed responsibility, it was revealed he had been threatened with murder.

In March 2025, Cottle was arrested in connection with a 2021 cracking of the Republican Party of Texas’ website; according to the indictment, he took credit for the hack on social media. This resulted in Cottle being sentenced to 18 months in prison in June 2026.

== Sakura Samurai ==
In 2020, Cottle joined the white hat hacking group Sakura Samurai, and was involved in the January 2021 disclosure of a United Nations breach, which exposed more than 100,000 private employee records. In August 2021, Cottle and other Sakura Samurai members helped to validate a vulnerability with Ford's website, exposing company records and enabling malicious account takeovers. Cottle left Sakura Samurai later that month, saying he wished to avoid "entanglements" pertaining to his other activities.
