= Higinio Ochoa =

American security researcher and activist

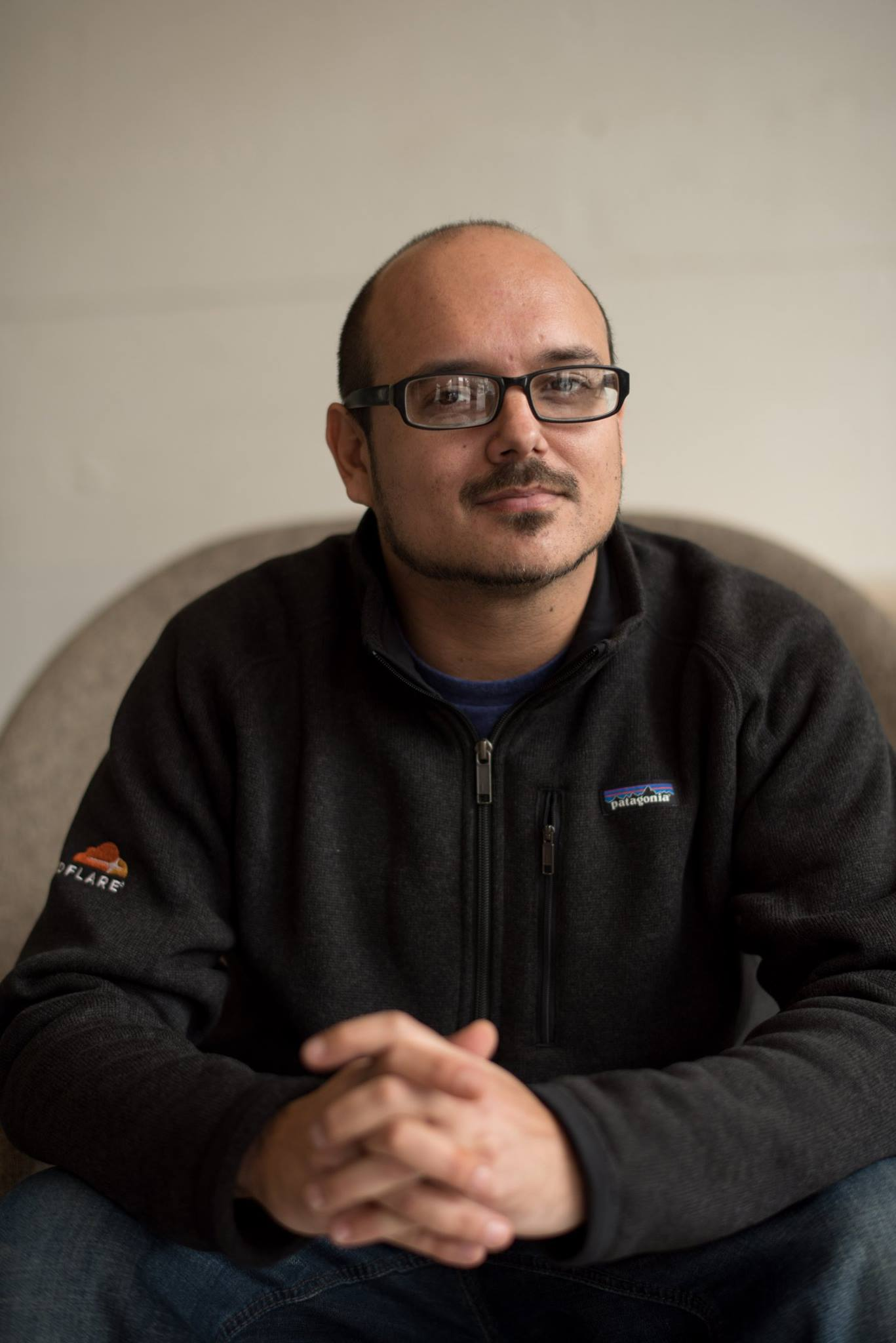
- Other name: w0rmer
- Known for: Operation: Pig Roast
- Criminal charges: Computer hacking

Higinio Ochoa, also known as w0rmer, is an American hacker. In 2012, while associated with the hacker group CabinCr3w (part of Anonymous), he was arrested by the US Federal Bureau of Investigation (FBI) and ultimately served two years in federal prison for hacking. As of 2021, Ochoa is a member of the white-hat hacker group Sakura Samurai.

== Career ==
Ochoa is a member of Sakura Samurai, a white-hat hacking group known for its large-scale breaches of governmental groups and corporations. Ochoa and others in Sakura Samurai were responsible for 2021 vulnerability disclosures pertaining to John Deere software.

== Early hacking and conviction ==
In February 2012, Ochoa hacked protected computers including those of the Texas Department of Public Safety, Alabama Department of Public Safety, West Virginia Chiefs of Police Association and Houston County, Alabama. After accessing the systems, Ochoa downloaded and shared confidential and personal information from the systems, erased data, and vandalized websites. At the time, Ochoa was associated with CabinCr3w, a hacker group that had grown out of Anonymous.

Ochoa was arrested by the FBI specifically in relation to his access of Alabama Department of Public Safety computers, which had for some reason been connected with an FBI criminal database. Ochoa replaced the FBI database with his self-proclaimed trademark, a photo of a woman in a bikini, holding a sign reading "PwNd by w0rmer & CabinCr3w, <3 u BiTch's!" The woman in the photo had taken the picture with an iPhone that had location services enabled. Through this, the FBI traced the photo back to her exact coordinates, discovered her identity, and found her Facebook page, which revealed Ochoa as her fiancé. The FBI arrested Ochoa on March 20, 2012, in Galveston, Texas.

On June 25, 2012, Ochoa was charged by the FBI with hacking into law enforcement systems and publishing personal information of officers, including phone numbers and home addresses, in what he and CabinCr3w called "Operation Pig Roast". Ochoa was sentenced to two years in prison and ordered to pay approximately US$14,000 restitution for unauthorized access to the agencies' computers. During his parole, Ochoa was legally banned from using the Internet or any computer or device connected to the Internet.

== Media ==
In 2015, Ochoa was featured in episode 21 of the podcast Reply All (podcast), in an episode titled "Hack the Police".

In 2016, Ochoa was featured in Season 1, Episode 4 of the Showtime series Dark Net, in an episode titled "CTRL".

In 2020, Ochoa was featured in episode 63 of the podcast Darknet Diaries, in an episode titled "w0rmer".

In 2026, Ochoa was featured in the May 1 episode of the podcast BarCode, in an episode titled "W0rmer".
