= Samy Kamkar =

American businessman (born 1985)

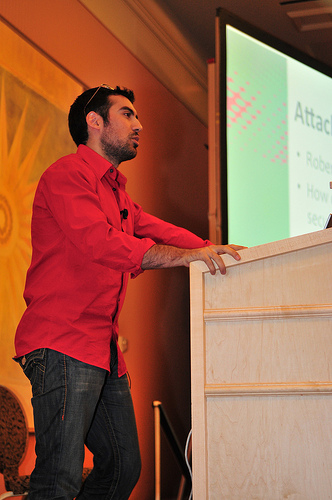
- Kamkar speaking at the Black Hat conference in 2010
- Born: December 10, 1985 (age 40)
- Occupations: Privacy and security researcher, computer hacker, whistleblower and entrepreneur
- Known for: Releasing the Samy worm, Evercookie, SkyJack, and iPhone, Android and Windows Mobile phone tracking research
- Website: sa.my

Samy Kamkar (born December 10, 1985) is an American privacy and security researcher, computer hacker and entrepreneur.

== Biography ==
At the age of 16, he dropped out of high school. One year later, he co-founded Fonality, a unified communications company based on open-source software, which raised over $46 million in private funding.

In 2005, he created and released the fastest spreading virus of all time, the MySpace worm Samy, and was subsequently raided by the United States Secret Service under the Patriot Act. He also created SkyJack, a custom drone which hacks into any nearby Parrot drones allowing them to be controlled by its operator and created the Evercookie, which appeared in a top-secret NSA document revealed by Edward Snowden and on the front page of The New York Times.

He has also worked with The Wall Street Journal, and discovered the illicit mobile phone tracking where the Apple iPhone, Google Android and Microsoft Windows Phone mobile devices transmit GPS and Wi-Fi information to their parent companies. His mobile research led to a series of class-action lawsuits against the companies and a privacy hearing on Capitol Hill. Kamkar has a chapter giving advice in Tim Ferriss' book Tools of Titans.

== Work ==
=== Samy worm ===
In 2005, Kamkar released the Samy worm, the first publicly released self-propagating cross-site scripting worm, onto MySpace. The worm carried a payload that would display the string "but most of all, Samy is my hero" on a victim's profile and cause the victim to unknowingly send a friend request to Kamkar. When a user viewed that profile, they would have the payload planted on their page. Within just 20 hours of its October 4, 2005 release, over one million users had run the payload, making it the fastest spreading virus of all time. The MySpace team temporarily shut down MySpace to fix the problem that allowed the worm to operate.

In 2006, Kamkar was raided by the United States Secret Service and Electronic Crimes Task Force, expanded from the Patriot Act, for releasing the worm. After being presented with a plea bargain for no prison time, but paying a fine of US$20,000, serving three years of probation, working 720 hours of community service, Kamkar pled guilty to a felony charge of computer hacking in Los Angeles Superior Court. Also per the aforementioned agreement, Kamkar was allowed to keep a single computer that was not connected to a network, but explicitly prohibited from any internet access during his sentence. Since 2008, Kamkar has been doing independent computer security and privacy research and consulting.

=== Flaw in PHP ===
In early 2010, Kamkar discovered a major flaw in all versions of the PHP programming language, specifically in the pseudorandom number generator, which allowed an attacker to hijack the session ID of a user and take over their session. Kamkar released a patch and once fixed, released exploit code demonstrating the attack which was possible on major banks, social networks, and forums.

=== Evercookie ===
In 2010, Kamkar released Evercookie, a cookie that "apparently cannot be deleted", which subsequently was documented on the front page of The New York Times. In 2013, a top-secret NSA document was leaked by Edward Snowden citing Evercookie as a method of tracking Tor users.

=== Mobile research ===
In 2011, Kamkar discovered the iPhone, Android and Windows Phone mobile devices were continuously sending GPS coordinates, correlated to Wi-Fi MAC addresses, back to Apple, Google and Microsoft respectively, and released his research through several front page The Wall Street Journal articles. The iPhone would continue to send location data "even when the location services were turned off". The Windows Phone would also continue to send location data "even when the user has not given the app permission to do so". He discovered that some of this data was exposed by Google and he released Androidmap, a tool exposing Google's database of Wi-Fi MAC addresses correlated to the physical coordinates populated by Android phones.

=== Parrot AR Drone research ===
In 2013, Kamkar created SkyJack, a combination of open source software and hardware to run on an unmanned aerial vehicle which was "engineered to autonomously seek out, hack, and wirelessly take over other Parrot drones within wifi distance, creating an army of zombie drones". The entire software and hardware specification was released as open source and detailed on his website. The software was released one day after Amazon.com announced Amazon Prime Air, a possible future delivery service using drones to deliver small packages in as early as 2015.

=== Automotive security research ===
On July 30, 2015, Kamkar introduced OwnStar - a small electronic device that could be concealed on or near a General Motors vehicle to interpose itself between the vehicle's OnStar link and the driver's OnStar RemoteLink app. In this classic man-in-the-middle attack, Kamkar, or any unauthorized user, could substitute his OnStar commands to locate, unlock, or start the vehicle. By August 11, General Motors had released upgrades to the OnStar server software and RemoteLink app to block such attacks.

In 2015, it was reported that Kamkar had built an inexpensive electronic device about the size of a wallet that could be concealed on or near a locked vehicle to capture a single keyless entry code to be used at a later time to unlock the vehicle. The device transmits a jamming signal to block the vehicle's reception of rolling code signals from the owner's fob, while recording these signals from both of his two attempts needed to unlock the vehicle. The recorded first code is sent to the vehicle only when the owner makes the second attempt, while the recorded second code is retained for future use. Kamkar stated that this vulnerability had been widely known for years to be present in many vehicle types, but was previously undemonstrated. A demonstration was announced for DEF CON 23.

=== Magnetic stripe and credit card emulation device ===
On November 24, 2015, Samy Kamkar released MagSpoof; a portable device that can spoof/emulate any magnetic stripe or credit card "wirelessly", even on standard magstripe readers by generating a strong electromagnetic field that emulates a traditional magnetic stripe card.

In his own words, MagSpoof can be used as a traditional credit card and simply store all of your credit cards (and with modification, can technically disable chip requirements) in various form factors, or can be used for security research in any area that would traditionally require a magstripe, such as readers for credit cards, drivers licenses, hotel room keys, automated parking lot tickets, etc.

=== Internet traffic hijacking ===
On November 16, 2016, Samy Kamkar released PoisonTap; a USB Ethernet emulator that can be used to hijack all Internet traffic on a target machine, even if the computer was password protected and locked.

A backdoored device can be remotely forced to make a request with its user's cookies on HTTP (unsecured) websites that have no security flags, meaning that the attacker can remotely impersonate a local user.

On May 2, 2022, a suspected North Korean spy recruited a 38-year-old South Korean crypto exchange executive and a 29-year-old military officer to use PoisonTap in order to hack into the Korean Joint Command and Control System (KJCCS).

=== Additional notable works ===
In 2008, after Kamkar's restriction from computers was lifted, he demonstrated weaknesses in Visa, MasterCard and Europay credit cards with near field communication (NFC) and radio-frequency identification (RFID) chips built in and released software demonstrating the ability to steal credit card information, including name, credit card number, and expiration date, wirelessly from these cards. He also released code demonstrating wireless identity theft of physical access control cards, including that of HID Global cards, using RFID with the use of only a credit card sized device, removing the need for any computer to be connected.

In 2010, Kamkar traveled to more than a dozen countries speaking about his mobile security research and weaknesses he discovered from his cryptanalysis of the PHP programming language, including speaking at some of the largest annual hacker conventions in the world such as DEF CON, Black Hat Briefings and ToorCon.

In late 2010, Kamkar traveled to Bratislava to attend Faraday Hack Day to help expose political and corporate corruption within Slovakia's government.

In early 2011, Kamkar joined the Board of Directors of Brave New Software, a non-profit organization originally funded by a multimillion-dollar U.S. State Department grant. The nonprofit is responsible for creating uProxy with the University of Washington and Google Ideas, a browser extension intended to allow users in repressive regimes to access the Internet without being monitored. The nonprofit also created Lantern, a network designed to circumvent Internet censorship and defeat the suppression of digital information and freedom of speech.

In addition to releasing the Evercookie as free and open source software, and exposing the surreptitious collection of data by Apple, Google and Microsoft, in 2011, Kamkar also exposed KISSmetrics, an online advertising network, and Hulu as recreating tracking cookies after consumers deleted them by storing the unique tracking identifiers in Flash cookies and HTML5 Local Storage, which were not automatically deleted when consumers cleared their browser cookies. Several companies identified as performing cookie respawning were subsequently sued by class-action lawyers. In January 2013, KISSmetrics settled its cookie respawning related lawsuit for $500,000.
