= 2024 National Public Data breach =

American data broker

In August 2024, three class-action lawsuits were filed against National Public Data along with over 14 complaints filed in federal court, claiming that the company permitted hackers to steal sensitive private information covering millions of individuals. The theft was alleged to have occurred in April 2024. One of the lawsuits specifically claims that in April, a hacker going by the moniker "USDoD" posted a notice on the dark web, offering the data for sale at the price of US$3.5 million.

The information stolen is alleged to include 2.9 billion records containing full names, current and past addresses, Social Security numbers, dates of birth, and telephone numbers. The stolen data contains records for people in the US, UK, and Canada. National Public Data confirmed on August 16, 2024, there was a breach originating from someone trying to breach their systems since December 2023, with the breach occurring from April 2024 and over the next few months. The company also confirmed that 2.9 billion records were obtained, though they were still working to determine how many people were affected by the breach, and were working with law enforcement to identify the hacker.

== Jerico Pictures ==
Jerico Pictures, Inc., doing business as National Public Data, was a data broker company that performed employee background checks. Their primary service was collecting information from public data sources, including criminal records, addresses, and employment history, and offering that information for sale.

On October 2, 2024, Jerico Pictures filed for Chapter 11 bankruptcy as it currently faces over a dozen lawsuits over the breach, and is potentially liable "for credit monitoring for hundreds of millions of potentially impacted individuals." The bankruptcy proceedings were dismissed in October 2024. In December 2024, National Public Data shut down, showing a closure notice on its website. In 2025, the National Public Data website returned online under a new owner, Perfect Privacy LLC, a company unrelated to the Perfect Privacy VPN service.
