= Samy (computer worm) =

Samy (also known as JS.Spacehero) is a cross-site scripting worm (XSS worm) that was designed to propagate across the social networking site MySpace by Samy Kamkar. Within just 20 hours of its October 4, 2005 release, over one million users had run the payload making Samy the fastest-spreading virus of all time.

The message on a victim's profile

The worm itself was relatively harmless; it carried a payload that would display the string "but most of all, samy is my hero" on a victim's MySpace profile page as well as send Samy a friend request. When a user viewed that profile page, the payload would then be replicated and planted on their own profile page continuing the distribution of the worm. MySpace has since secured its site against the vulnerability.

Samy Kamkar, the author of the worm, was raided by the United States Secret Service and Electronic Crimes Task Force in 2006 for releasing the worm. He entered a plea agreement on January 31, 2007, to a felony charge. The action resulted in Kamkar being sentenced to three years' probation with only one (remotely-monitored) computer and no access to the Internet for life (this provision was later struck off by a judge), 90 days' community service, and $15,000–$20,000 in restitution, as well as a 20-year suspended prison sentence, as directly reported by Kamkar himself on "Greatest Moments in Hacking History" by Vice Media's video website, Motherboard.
