= Geoff White =

British writer

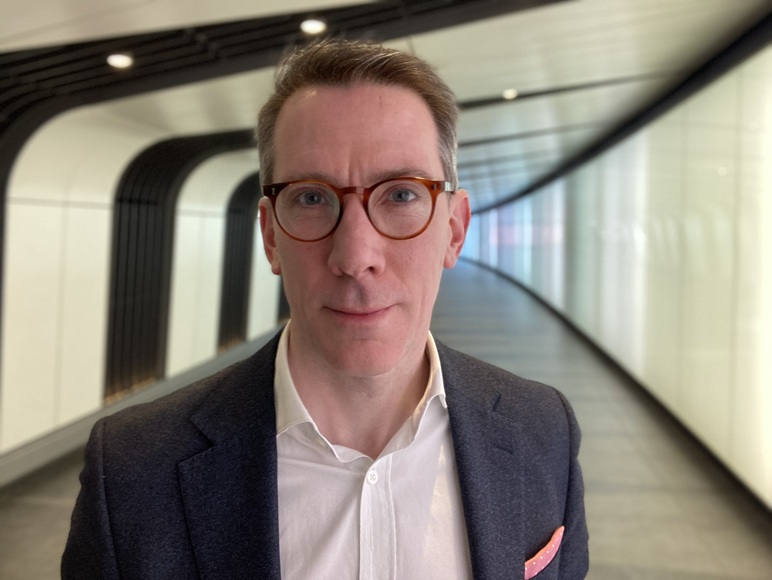
Geoff White

Geoff White is a British author and investigative journalist, covering the topics of organised crime and technology, including cybersecurity, financial crime, fraud and money laundering.

== Career ==
White was the technology correspondent for Channel 4 News from 2010 to 2016. He was the creator of the programme's Data Baby project, which used a synthetic identity to expose the trade in online data. The project was nominated for a Royal Television Society Award in the Innovation category in 2014 and won the Online Media Award for Technical Innovation in the same year. White also won in the Digital Writer of the Year category.

White extensively covered the hacking of the British ISP TalkTalk for both Channel 4 News and BBC News, exposing links to fraudulent call centre infrastructure in India. He was nominated for a British Journalism Award for Technology Journalism for his work in 2017.

White co-created the live, mobile phone interception stage show The Secret Life of Your Mobile Phone, which revealed personal data leaking from handsets. The show was performed at the Edinburgh Festival Fringe in 2017, in addition to the Latitude music festival, and at fringe events at both the Conservative and Labour Party annual conferences.

He was the creator, writer and presenter of the 10-part Audible Originals series The Dark Web, which was published in February 2018 and covered the creation by the US Naval Research Laboratory of the TOR hidden services network, and its subsequent evolution The series was nominated in the Technology category for the British Specialist Journalism Awards in 2018. White subsequently researched, wrote and presented the 6-part Audible Originals podcast series Artificial Intelligence: Friend or Foe, which was published in May 2019.

White researched and co-presented the hit BBC World Service 20-part podcast series The Lazarus Heist with journalist Jean Lee, which explored North Korea's cyber activity from its alleged hacking of Sony Pictures Entertainment in 2014 onwards. The series was nominated for a Peabody Award in 2021 and a Rose D'or Award in the same year in the category of Audio Entertainment.

In 2025 the BBC integrated The Lazarus Heist into the Cyber Hack podcast strand. White researched and presented Season 4 of the strand, Cyber Hack: The Conti Files, which detailed the working of the Conti ransomware group.

White is the author of three books on the topics of cybersecurity, financial crime, fraud and money laundering. Crime Dot Com: From Viruses to Vote Rigging, How Hacking Went Global was published by Reaktion Books in August 2020. It was nominated for Cyber Book of the Year in the National Cyber Awards in 2021. The Lazarus Heist - From Hollywood to High Finance : Inside North Korea's Global Cyber War was adapted from the BBC World Service podcast of the same name, and published by Penguin Random House in June 2022. Rinsed: From Cartels to Crypto: How the Tech Industry Washes Money for the World's Deadliest Crooks was published by Penguin Random House in June 2024.

White is a frequent public speaker on the topics of cybersecurity, financial crime, fraud and money laundering, and has delivered presentations at venues ranging from the Hay Festival to the RSA Conference.

== Publications ==
- Crime Dot Com: From Viruses to Vote Rigging, How Hacking Went Global (2020), Reaktion Books, ISBN 978-1-78914-285-3
- The Lazarus Heist - From Hollywood to High Finance : Inside North Korea's Global Cyber War (2022), Penguin Random House, ISBN 978-0-241-55425-8
- Rinsed: From Cartels to Crypto: How the Tech Industry Washes Money for the World's Deadliest Crooks (2024), Penguin Random House, ISBN 978-0-241-62483-8
