= Vitaliy Goncharuk =

American entrepreneur

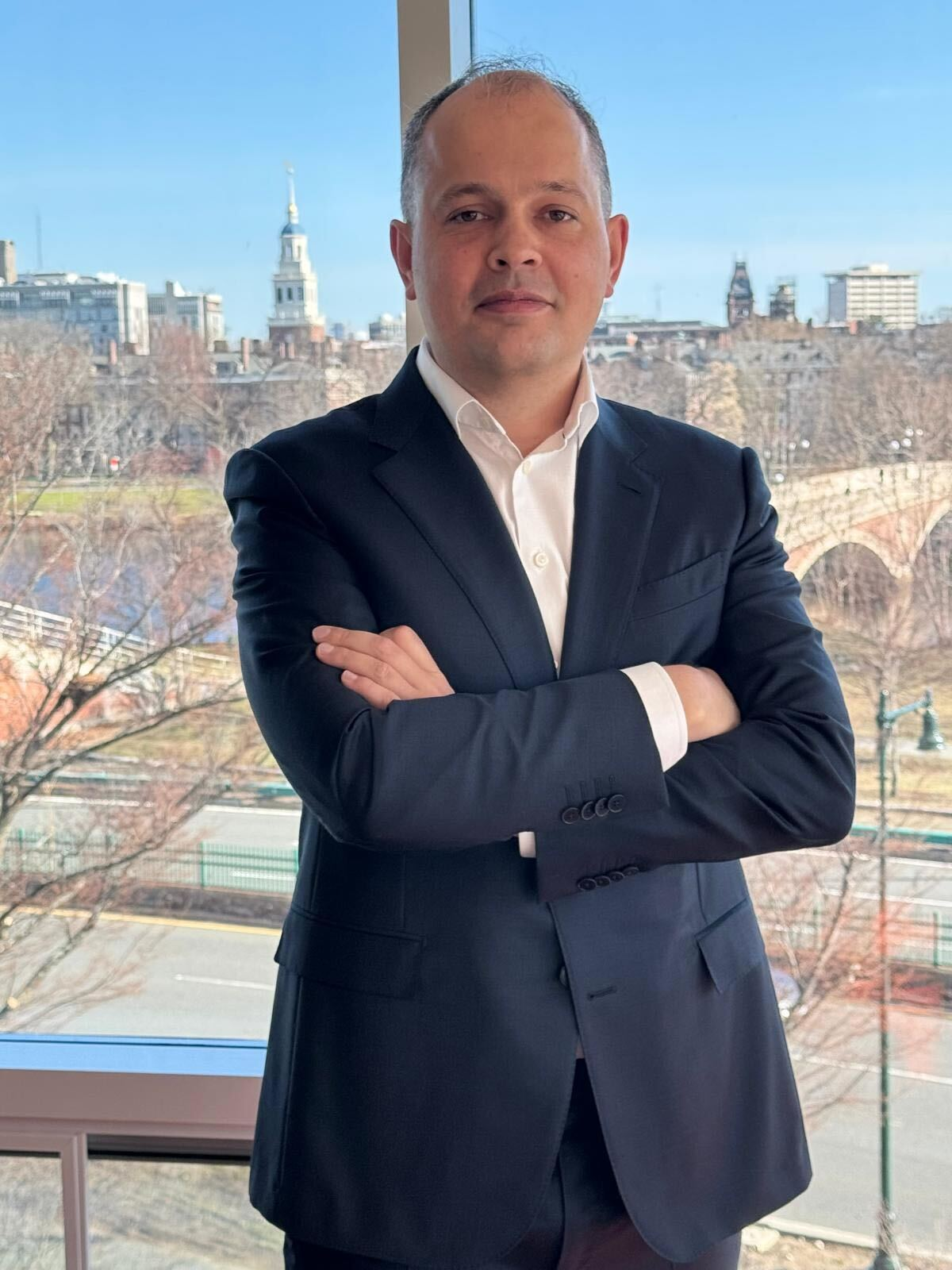
- Born: June 29, 1983 (age 43); Odesa, Ukraine
- Education: Harvard Business School; European School of Political Studies, France; Odesa National University named after Mechnikov, Applied Mathematics, Business Administration; Richelieu Lyceum
- Occupations: Entrepreneur in Artificial Intelligence, Metaverse, and Robotics
- Known for: Founding Augmented Pixels (acquired by Qualcomm)

Vitaliy Goncharuk (born June 29, 1983, Odesa, Ukraine) is an American Tech entrepreneur with Ukrainian roots and the founder of Augmented Pixels, a U.S.-based company specializing in AI-autonomous navigation (visual localization and 3D mapping) for drones and Augmented Reality Glasses. From 2022 to 2023, he served as a Senior Director of Engineering at the multinational American company Qualcomm.

From 2019 to 2022, Goncharuk chaired the Expert Committee on the Development of Artificial Intelligence in Ukraine under the Ministry of Digital Transformation of Ukraine.

Goncharuk resides in Washington D.C.

== Biography ==
Vitaliy Goncharuk was born on June 29, 1983, in Odesa, Ukraine. In 2000, he graduated from the Richelieu Lyceum, the leading mathematics school in Odesa, where Goncharuk was involved in olympiad programming, cryptography, and aeromodelling. He graduated from the Odesa National University, where he studied applied mathematics and business administration.

In 2023, he began studying in the Harvard Business School's Owner/President Management (OPM) program.

== Career ==
Goncharuk began his career in 2000 as a lead developer for the instant messaging application IM+, which had over 50 million users at its peak.

In 2011, he founded Augmented Pixels in Palo Alto, California, a company specializing in AI-autonomous navigation (visual localization and 3D mapping) for drones and Augmented Reality Glasses. The same year, Goncharuk founded the Eastern European Computer Vision Conference (EECVC), an annual event in Odesa that brings together researchers and developers in computer vision.

In 2018, Goncharuk participated as a founding member of the Open AR Cloud Foundation, which focuses on developing the concept of the "metaverse" by integrating augmented reality technologies to create digital spaces.

In 2019, he initiated and chaired the Expert Committee on Artificial Intelligence Development in Ukraine under the Ministry of Digital Transformation, which developed a national concept for AI development in Ukraine, and chaired it until 2022.

In 2020, Goncharuk joined the Special Committee on Artificial Intelligence of the Council of Europe and contributed to international AI projects.

In 2021, Forbes listed Augmented Pixels among the top 30 startups. The same year, the company launched the GlobalMap.AI platform for creating 3D maps as part of its mapping initiatives.

In 2022, Qualcomm acquired Augmented Pixels and announced the opening of an R&D center in Ukraine.

Goncharuk remains active in the technology sector, participating in international conferences on artificial intelligence and augmented reality.

Since 2022, Vitaliy has also been involved in the military aspects of Artificial Intelligence (AI) use. In 2024, Springer published the book The Very Long Game, in which Goncharuk co-authored the chapter "Survival of the Smartest? Defense AI in Ukraine." Later, the International Center of Defense and Security published Goncharuk's research, Artificial Intelligence in Defense of Ukraine.

He is also the author of scientific and public articles addressing the impact of technology on society and managing innovative teams.
