= List of cybercriminals =

Convicted computer criminals are people who are caught and convicted of computer crimes such as breaking into computers or computer networks. Computer crime can be broadly defined as criminal activity involving information technology infrastructure, including illegal access (unauthorized access), illegal interception (by technical means of non-public transmissions of computer data to, from or within a computer system), data interference (unauthorized damaging, deletion, deterioration, alteration or suppression of computer data), systems interference (interfering with the functioning of a computer system by inputting, transmitting, damaging, deleting, deteriorating, altering or suppressing computer data), misuse of devices, forgery (or identity theft) and electronic fraud.

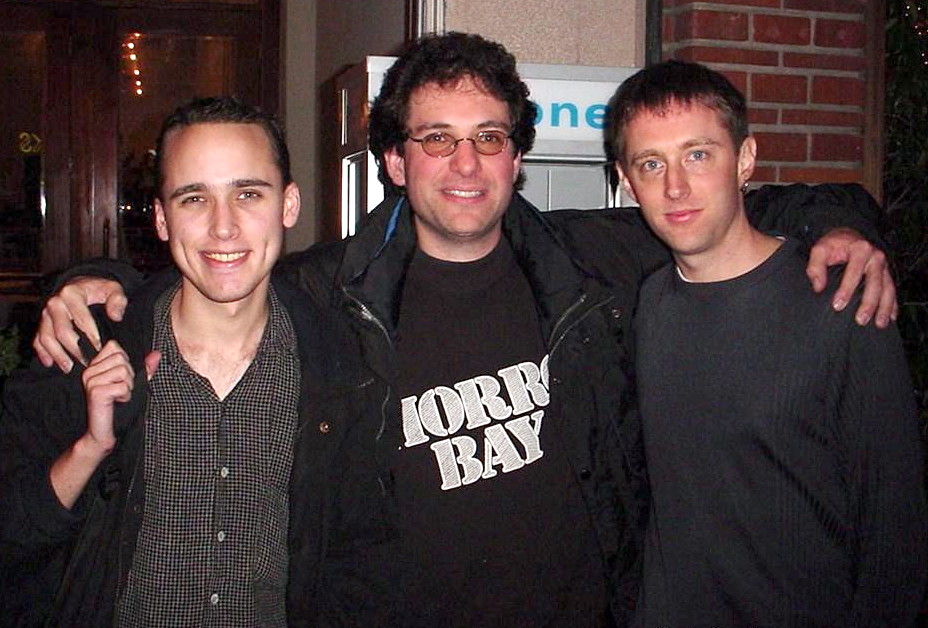
Hacker Adrian Lamo (left) with Kevin Mitnick and Kevin Poulsen

In the infancy of the hacker subculture and the computer underground, criminal convictions were rare because there was an informal code of ethics that was followed by white hat hackers. Proponents of hacking claim to be motivated by artistic and political ends, but are often unconcerned about the use of criminal means to achieve them. White hat hackers break past computer security for non-malicious reasons and do no damage, akin to breaking into a house and looking around. They enjoy learning and working with computer systems, and by this experience gain a deeper understanding of electronic security. As the computer industry matured, individuals with malicious intentions (black hats) would emerge to exploit computer systems for their own personal profit.

Convictions of computer crimes, or hacking, began as early as 1984 with the case of The 414s from the 414 area code in Milwaukee. In that case, six teenagers broke into a number of high-profile computer systems, including Los Alamos National Laboratory, Sloan-Kettering Cancer Center and Security Pacific Bank. On May 1, 1984, one of the 414s, Gerald Wondra, was sentenced to two years of probation. In May 1986, the first computer trespass conviction to result in a jail sentence was handed down to Michael Princeton Wilkerson, who received two weeks in jail for his infiltration of Microsoft, Sundstrand Corp., Kenworth Truck Co. and Resources Conservation Co.

In 2006, a prison term of nearly five years was handed down to Jeanson James Ancheta, who created hundreds of zombie computers to do his bidding via giant bot networks or botnets. He then sold the botnets to the highest bidder, who in turn used them for denial-of-service (DoS) attacks.

The longest prison sentence imposed for computer-related crimes is that of Ross Ulbricht, who in 2015 was sentenced to life imprisonment without the possibility of parole for operating the Silk Road darknet market. Prior to this, the longest sentence was held by Albert Gonzalez, who received a 20-year term in 2010.[11]. The next longest sentences are those of 13 years for Max Butler, 108 months for Brian Salcedo in 2004 and upheld in 2006 by the U.S. 4th Circuit Court of Appeals, and 68 months for Kevin Mitnick in 1999.

== Computer criminals ==
Name	Handle	Nationality	Conviction(s)	Sentencing date(s)	Penalty
Gerald Wondra	The 414s	United States	Unauthorized access to computers at the Sloan-Kettering Cancer Center in New York and a Los Angeles bank and two counts of "making harassing telephone calls"	1 May 1984	Two years probation
Michael Princeton Wilkerson	The Sprinter	United States	Four counts of Illegal Computer Trespass to computers at: Microsoft, Sundstrand Data Control, Kenworth Truck Co. and Resources Conservation Co. (a Boeing subsidiary)	7 May 1986	Two weeks jail sentence, 200 hours community service, two years probation, fined US$2,000
Markus Hess	—	Germany	Found guilty of espionage	15 February 1990	One to two years suspended sentence
Robert Tappan Morris	rtm	United States	Intentional access of federal interest computers without authorization thereby preventing authorized access and causing a loss in excess of US$1,000	7 March 1991	Three years probation and 400 hours of community service in a manner determined by the Probation Office and approved by the Court
Leonard Rose	Terminus	United States	Illicit use of proprietary software (UNIX 3.2 code) owned by AT&T and 2 counts of computer fraud and three counts of interstate transportation of stolen property	12 June 1991	One-year jail sentence
Richard Jones	Electron	Australia	Trespassing on the University of Texas computer network and theft of the ZARDOZ file	1993	One year and six months suspended sentence, 300 hours of community service and psychiatric assessment and treatment
Nahshon Even-Chaim	Phoenix	Australia	15 charges including trespassing on the University of Texas computer network, altering data at NASA and the theft of the ZARDOZ file	1993	One-year suspended sentence: A$1,000 good-behaviour bond and 500 hours community service
Mark Abene	Phiber Optik	United States	Misdemeanor theft-of-service for a free-call scam to a 900 number	1991	35 hours of community service
Mark Abene	Phiber Optik	United States	One count of computer trespass and one count of computer conspiracy	1993	One-year jail sentence
Chris Pile	The Black Baron	United Kingdom	Writing and distributing computer viruses	1995	18 months in prison
Kevin Poulsen	Dark Dante	United States	Pleaded guilty to seven counts of mail, wire and computer fraud, money laundering and obstruction of justice	10 April 1995	51 months in prison and ordered to pay US$56,000 in restitution
Julian Paul Assange	Mendax/profff	Australia	31 charges of hacking and related charges. Pleaded guilty to 25 charges, the remaining 6 were dropped.	5 December 1996	A recorded conviction on all counts, a reparation payment of A$2,100 to ANU (to be paid in 3 months time) and a A$5,000 good-behaviour bond
Kevin Mitnick	Condor	United States	Four counts of wire fraud, two counts of computer fraud and one count of illegally intercepting a wire communication	9 August 1999	46 months in federal prison and US$4,125 in restitution
Jonathan James	c0mrade	United States	Two counts of juvenile delinquency	21 September 2000	Six-month prison sentence and probation until the age of eighteen
David D'Amato	Terri DiSisto	United States	Found guilty of email bombings which caused service outages at a number of colleges and universities; victims were young males from whom he solicited tickling videos who had stopped co-operating with his requests	2001	Fined $5,000 (USD) and sentenced to six months in federal prison
Dennis Moran	Coolio	United States	Misdemeanor charges of hacking	9 March 2001	Nine months in jail and US$5,000 in restitution to each victim
Ehud Tenenbaum	Analyzer	Israel	Admitted to cracking US and Israeli computers, and pleaded guilty to conspiracy, wrongful infiltration of computerized material, disruption of computer use and destroying evidence	15 June 2001	Six months of community service, one year of probation, a two-year suspended prison sentence and fined about US$18,000
Raphael Gray	Curador	United Kingdom	Pleaded guilty to theft and hacking offenses which fall under the Computer Misuse Act and six charges of intentionally accessing sites containing credit card details and using this information for financial gain	6 July 2001	Three years of psychiatric treatment after evidence emerged that he was suffering from a mental condition which needed medical treatment rather than incarceration
Michael Calce	Mafiaboy	Canada	Pleaded guilty to 56 charges of "mischief to data"	12 September 2001	Eight months "open custody", by the Montreal Youth Court, one year of probation, restricted use of the Internet and a small fine
Jan de Wit	OnTheFly	Netherlands	Spreading data into a computer network with the intention of causing damage as the creator of the Anna Kournikova virus	27 September 2001	150 hours community service
Gary McKinnon	Solo	United Kingdom	Accused in 2002 of perpetrating the "biggest military computer hack of all time," although McKinnon himself states that he was merely looking for evidence of free energy suppression and a cover-up of UFO activity and other technologies potentially useful to the public	2002	On 16 October 2012, after a series of legal proceedings in Britain, Home Secretary Theresa May withdrew her extradition order to the United States
David L. Smith	Kwyjibo	United States	Pleaded guilty to knowingly spreading a computer virus, the Melissa virus, with the intent to cause damage	1 May 2002	20 months in federal prison, US$5,000 fine and 100 hours of community service upon release
Jerome Heckenkamp	MagicFX	United States	Admitted the hacking and pleaded guilty to two felonies in 2004	2004	Sentenced to time served after spending seven months in prison
Kimberley Vanvaeck	Gigabyte	Belgium	Wrote the Coconut-A, Sahay-A, and Sharp-A (first virus written in C#) computer viruses. Charged and arrested for computer data sabotage against internet security firm Sophos.	16 February 2004	Released within 24 hours on bail due to being a minor (17 years old)
Adrian Lamo	—	United States	One-count of computer crimes against Microsoft, LexisNexis and The New York Times	15 July 2004	Six months detention at his parents' home plus two years probation and roughly US$65,000 in restitution
Jeffrey Lee Parson	T33kid	United States	Pleaded guilty on August 11, 2004, to one count of intentionally causing or attempting to cause damage to a protected computer via his version of the Blaster computer worm	28 January 2005	18 months in prison and 100 hours of community service
Cameron Lacroix	cam0	United States	Pleaded guilty to hacking into the cell-phone account of celebrity Paris Hilton and participated in an attack on data-collection firm LexisNexis Group that exposed personal records of more than 300,000 consumers	13 September 2005	11 months in a Massachusetts juvenile detention facility
Jeanson James Ancheta	Gobo	United States	Pleaded guilty to four federal charges of violating United States Code Section 1030, Fraud and Related Activity in Connection with Computers, specifically subsections (a)(5)(A)(i), 1030 (a)(5)(B)(i) and 1030(b)	8 May 2006	57 months in prison, forfeit a 1993 BMW and more than US$58,000 in profit Restitution of US$15,000 to the U.S. federal government for infecting military computers
Samy Kamkar	samy	United States	Pleaded guilty to violating California Penal Code 502(c)(8) for creating the "Samy is my hero" XSS worm that spread across the MySpace social networking site	2007	Three years of formal probation, 90 days of community service, restitution paid to MySpace, restrictions on computer use
Andrew Auernheimer	Weev	United States (at time of sentencing)	On November 20, 2012, was found guilty of one count of identity fraud and one count of conspiracy to access a computer without authorization	20 November 2012	Auernheimer was sentenced to 41 months in federal prison and ordered to pay $73,000 in restitution
David Schrooten	Fortezza/Xakep	Netherlands	Accused of causing 63 million dollars in damages, primarily for his role in trafficking credit cards he obtained by hacking other hackers. Pleaded guilty to conspiracy to commit access device fraud and bank fraud, access device fraud, bank fraud, intentional damage to a protected computer, and aggravated identity theft.	1 February 2013	Extradited from Romania and sentenced to 144 months in U.S. federal prison
Lewys Martin	sl1nk	United Kingdom	Pleaded guilty to five counts of "unauthorised acts with intent to impair operation of or prevent/hinder access to a computer", two of "unauthorised computer access with intent to commit other offences", one of "unauthorised computer access with intent to commit other offences", and one of "unauthorised access to computer material". Hacking attempt on the websites of Kent Police, Cambridge University and Oxford University. Former member of NullCrew and said to have penetrated the servers of Department of Defense (DoD), Pentagon, NASA, NSA, other UK government websites.	16 May 2013	Two years imprisonment
Kristina Svechinskaya	—	Russia	Accused of using Zeus Trojan horse to attack thousands of bank accounts and opened at least five accounts in Bank of America and Wachovia. It is estimated that with nine other people Svechinskaya had skimmed $3 million in total.	24 June 2013	Signed a personal recognizance bond and was released under $25,000 bail. Ordered to pay $35,000 in damages.
Ross Ulbricht	altoid/frosty/Dread Pirate Roberts	United States	Money laundering, conspiracy to commit computer hacking, and conspiracy to traffic narcotics	29 May 2015	Double life imprisonment plus forty years, without the possibility of parole. Pardoned by Donald Trump on January 21, 2025.
Hamza Bendelladj	Bx1	Algeria	Pleaded guilty to one count of conspiring to commit wire and bank fraud, 10 counts of wire fraud, one count of conspiring to commit computer fraud and abuse, and 11 counts of computer fraud and abuse He is a co-creator of Trojan horse SpyEye. He stole from 217 American banks in total stealing $400 million and is alleged to have donated all the money to Africa and Palestine, though Trial documents did not mention any donations or charity activities. Despite much false information on the internet Bendelladj did not get sentenced to death, and claims saying he donated any money to charity is almost impossible to verify. The SpyEye software was also sold to other hackers and used as part of a botnet.	23 April 2016	15 years jail sentence
Roman Seleznev	Track2	Russian	Convicted of 38 counts involving unauthorized access of business information systems and stealing over two million credit card numbers. Pleaded guilty to conspiracy to commit bank fraud.	August 2016 and September 2017	Sentenced to 27 years' imprisonment for the 2016 conviction, concurrent with sentence of 14 years for the second set of charges
Brad Carter	Phone Losers of America	United States	Intentionally accessing a public computer without authorization to make prank calls to a customer list	October 2017	Eight months of home detention, five years probation, $19,600 in restitution
Tyler King	—	United States	Conspiring to commit computer fraud, computer fraud, and two counts of aggravated identity theft	2019	57 months federal prison
Conor Brian Fitzpatrick	Pompompurin	United States	Conspiracy to commit access device fraud, access device fraud, and possession of child pornography	January 2024	20 years of supervised release
Elliott Gunton	Glubz/planet	United Kingdom	Money laundering, Computer Misuse Act crimes, breaching a Sexual Harm Prevention Order, conspiracy to commit fraud	November 2016; August 2019; July 2024	3½ years of imprisonment (most recent)
Aleksanteri Kivimäki	zeekill/ryan	Finland	Stealing personal information and attempted extortion to Vastaamo and its individual patients. Convicted of aggravated dissemination of information violating personal privacy, attempted aggravated extortion and aggravated extortion.	30 April 2024 (käräjäoikeus) 26 February 2026 (hovioikeus)	6 years and 3 months in prison and undecided amount of compensation; later increased to 6 years and 11 months

== See also ==
- Timeline of computer security hacker history
