= Underground: The Julian Assange Story =

Australian television film

- Genre: Drama
- Based on: Underground
- Written by: Robert Connolly
- Screenplay by: Robert Connolly
- Story by: Suelette Dreyfus
- Directed by: Robert Connolly
- Starring: Rachel Griffiths; Anthony LaPaglia; Alex Williams; Laura Wheelwright
- Theme music composer: François Tétaz
- Country of origin: Australia
- Original language: English

Production
- Producers: Tony Ayres; Rick Maier; Helen Bowden
- Cinematography: Andrew Commis
- Editor: Andy Canny
- Running time: 88 minutes
- Production companies: Matchbox Pictures; Universal Pictures

Original release
- Network: Network Ten
- Release: 7 October 2012

Underground: The Julian Assange Story is an Australian television film produced for Network Ten. It premiered at the 2012 Toronto International Film Festival and aired on Network Ten on 7 October 2012. The film describes the exploits of a group of Australian, American, and British computer hackers during the 1980s and early 1990s, among them famous Australian hacker Julian Assange.

== Synopsis ==
In 1989, known as "Mendax", Assange and two friends formed a group called the International Subversives. Using early home computers and defining themselves as "white hat hackers" – those who look but don't steal – they broke into some of the world's most powerful and secretive organisations. They were in the eyes of the US Government, a major threat to national security. At the urging of the FBI, the Australian Federal Police set up a special taskforce to catch them, but, lacking the skills, first had to figure out where to begin.

== Cast ==
- Alex Williams as Julian Assange
- Rachel Griffiths as Christine Assange
- Anthony LaPaglia as Detective Ken Roberts
- Laura Wheelwright as Electra
- Callan McAuliffe as Prime Suspect
- Jordan Raskopoulos as Trax
- Benedict Samuel as Jonah
- Daniel Frederiksen as Wayne
- Ian Bliss as Vince

== Production ==
=== Background ===
The film draws its title from Underground: Tales of Hacking, Madness and Obsession on the Electronic Frontier, a 1997 book by Suelette Dreyfus, researched by Julian Assange, but the film bears little relation to the book itself, which catalogues the exploits of a group of Australian, American, and British hackers during the 1980s and early 1990s, among them Assange himself.

The film was not approved by Julian Assange, Wikileaks, nor any other member of the Assange family, and there was no collaboration with the Assanges or Wikileaks during the making of the film. However, Julian Assange subsequently had "a very favourable response to the movie".

=== Filming and crew ===
Filmed in and around Melbourne, the film was written and directed by Robert Connolly and produced by Matchbox Pictures' Helen Bowden, with Tony Ayres and Rick Maier serving as executive producers.

=== Music ===
The soundtrack was composed by Australian composer and sound engineer François Tétaz.

== Broadcast and reception ==
The film premiered at the 2012 Toronto International Film Festival (TIFF) in September 2012.

Around 1.34 million viewers watched the Australian television premiere on 7 October 2012. It was also the top trending topic in Australia on Twitter during the broadcast.

The film was re-broadcast by Channel 10 on 27 June 2024, a day following Assange's return to Australia after striking a plea bargain with the US.

=== Critical reception ===
The film received mixed reviews from critics. Ahead of the premiere at TIFF, Daniel Janvier of Toronto Film Scene wrote "This film is deeply frustrating watch. It takes the approach of many biopics – cramming in as much information as possible ... If this were a televised miniseries, with multiple installments to cover everything it wants to perhaps it would be better served". Also at TIFF, Kevin Jagernauth of The Playlist wrote: "There are many ways in which the story of Julian Assange can be sensationalized... but as one of the first major productions out of the gate, Connolly and his cast do it right... Underground entertainingly and informatively captures a teenager at the cusp of historical, technological and journalistic revolution, and reveals how it shaped him into the man he has since become".

Australian critics were more positive. David Knox of TV Tonight described it as "a terrific yarn that elevates Assange as a journalistic warrior, and Alex Williams as a new star". Karl Quinn writing in The Age concluded the film was "A considered yet gripping look at the crucible in which Julian Assange was formed and, arguably, deformed. Brilliant."

The telefeature has received two nominations at the 2nd AACTA Awards (Australian Academy of Cinema and Television Arts), including Best Telefeature, Mini Series or Short Run Series and Best Guest or Supporting Actress in a Television Drama for Laura Wheelwright.

=== Other reactions ===
Julian Assange himself was reported to have had "a very favourable response to the movie" and "particularly likes the actor who plays him".

Christine Assange, Julian Assange's mother, wrote "I was relieved and very happy to see how accurately Julian was portrayed" and "Alex Williams was so convincing at times I actually felt I was looking at my son" but "I did cringe at times while viewing the portrayal of my own character".

Former head of the Australian Federal Police computer crime unit Ken Dey criticised the film as "a work of fiction masquerading as fact", in particular the portrayed infiltration of MILNET which they claimed never happened.

== Accolades ==
The score was nominated for Best Music for a Mini-Series or Telemovie in the APRA Music Awards of 2013.

== See also ==
- The Fifth Estate — 2013 DreamWorks film starring Benedict Cumberbatch
