= Adam Botbyl =

American computer hacker from Michigan

Adam Botbyl is an American computer hacker from Michigan. He gained unauthorized access to the Lowes corporate computer network via an open, unsecured wireless access point used by the Lowe's chain of home improvement and hardware stores. The access point was initially discovered inadvertently by his then-roommate, Paul Timmins. Months later, Botbyl and Salcedo returned to explore and exploit the network at a store located in Southfield, Michigan. They then attempted to install a program that could have allowed them to capture the credit card information of customers conducting transactions through the Southfield store.

The government claimed that the crime could have caused more than $2.5 million in damages. The three men were initially charged with 16 counts of wire fraud and unauthorized intrusion. Botbyl pleaded guilty to one count of Conspiracy, and the remaining counts were dismissed on the government's motion, per a plea bargain. Ultimately, Botbyl was sentenced to 26 months imprisonment, followed by two years of supervised release.

On September 1, 2006, Botbyl was released from Federal Bureau of Prisons custody. His supervised release ended seven months early, on January 28, 2008.

== See also ==
- List of convicted computer criminals
