= Backdoor.Win32.IRCBot =

2011 computer worm

Backdoor.Win32.IRCBot (also known as W32/Checkout (McAfee), W32.Mubla (Symantec), W32/IRCBot-WB (Sophos), and Backdoor.Win32.IRCBot.aaq (Bydoon Center)) is a backdoor computer worm that is spread through MSN Messenger and Windows Live Messenger. Once installed on a PC, the worm copies itself into a Windows system folder, creates a new file displayed as "Windows Genuine Advantage Validation Notification" and becomes part of the computer's automatic startup. In addition, it attempts to send itself to all MSN contacts by offering an attachment named 'photos.zip'. Executing this file will install the worm onto the local PC. The Win32.IRCBot worm provides a backdoor server and allows a remote intruder to gain access and control over the computer via an Internet Relay Chat channel. This allows for confidential information to be transmitted to a hacker.

Because of a lack of standard naming conventions and also because of common features, variants of Win32.IRCBot can often be confused with the Agobot and Spybot family of worms. For example, Sophos lists Backdoor.Win32.IRCBot.ul, W32/Poebot-JT worm, and Win32/IRCBot.TS as aliases of the W32/Gaobot.worm.gen.e worm, a member of the Agobot family.

== See also ==
- Internet Relay Chat
- Comparison of Internet Relay Chat bots
- Malware
- Botnet
- Trojan horse (computing)
