= Nahshon Even-Chaim =

Australian computer hacker (born 1971)

- Born: Nahshon Even-Chaim; May 1971 (age 55)
- Other name: Phoenix
- Occupations: Former hacker, IT professional
- Known for: Member of The Realm, hacking into defense and nuclear research networks
- Status: Convicted (1993)
- Motive: Cybercrime
- Convictions: 15 counts of computer intrusion and related offenses (1993)
- Criminal charges: Computer intrusion, unauthorized access, data alteration
- Penalty: 500 hours community service, 12-month suspended jail term

Details
- Date apprehended: 2 April 1990

Nahshon Even-Chaim (born May 1971), aka Phoenix, is a convicted former computer hacker in Australia. He was one of the most highly skilled members of a computer hacking group called The Realm, based in Melbourne, Australia, from the late 1980s until his arrest by the Australian Federal Police in early 1990. His targets centred on defense and nuclear weapons research networks.

== The trail of evidence ==
Even-Chaim began breaking into systems by dialing indirectly or placing a call through X.25 networks, later taking advantage of Internet connectivity as it became available. He developed a reputation within The Realm, his computer hacking group, for his skill and arrogance.

In late 1988 Australian Federal Police officers discovered his identity using a combination of undercover work and informants. Aided by new computer crime legislation that came into force in June 1989, the AFP obtained a warrant in January 1990 to eavesdrop not only on Even-Chaim's phone conversations but also the data transmitted through his modem. The tap on his voice calls, which began on 26 January 1990, ran for eight weeks, while the data tap started two weeks later and ran for six weeks. The intercepts were being monitored by the AFP at its Telephone Intercept Branch in Canberra, 650 km from Even-Chaim's home.

Both intercepts provided police with sufficient evidence to prosecute him and two other members of his hacking group, Richard Jones, a.k.a. Electron and David John Woodcock, a.k.a. Nom. The data taps revealed Even-Chaim spent marathon sessions at his computer, working at a rapid pace to enter and tamper with computer systems. It was the first time in the world a remote data intercept had been used to gain evidence for a computer crime prosecution.

Transcripts of the phone taps captured Even-Chaim laughing with another hacker about how he had been "fucking with NASA", adding: "Yeah, they're gonna really want me bad. This is fun!" In another conversation, this time with an American hacker, he claimed: "The guys down at the local universities here are screaming with rage because they couldn't get rid of us. The Americans are getting pretty damn pissed off with me because I'm doing so much and they can't do much about it. I'm getting to the point now where I can get into almost any system on the Internet. I've virtually raped the Internet beyond belief."

Accounts of the police investigation that identified Even-Chaim and the two other offenders, as well as their arrest and prosecution, are contained in the book Hackers: The Hunt for Australia’s Most Infamous Computer Cracker, co-written by Bill Apro, an AFP computer crime investigator who led the investigation, in the book Underground: Tales of Hacking, Madness and Obsession on the Electronic Frontier by Suelette Dreyfus and In the Realm of the Hackers, a film by Kevin Anderson.

== Even-Chaim's targets ==
Even-Chaim pleaded guilty to 15 charges, which involved his intrusion into computers at:

- Commonwealth Scientific and Industrial Research Organisation in Melbourne, where he gained unauthorised access to and copied Zardoz, a computer industry bulletin identifying security weaknesses in Unix operating systems;
- University of California, Berkeley (inserting data);
- NASA in Virginia (accessing data, inserting data, altering data, obstructing the lawful use of the NASA computer);
- Lawrence Livermore National Laboratory, Livermore, California (altering data, interfering with a computer);
- University of Wisconsin–Madison (inserting data);
- Purdue University, West Lafayette, Indiana (inserting data).

After allegedly compromising computers used by computer security experts Eugene Spafford, Clifford Stoll, and Russell L. Brand (at LLNL), Even-Chaim called New York Times journalist John Markoff in response to an article in which Markoff had attributed a recent spate of computer break-ins to a worm. Even-Chaim boasted to Markoff that the break-ins had been the work of himself and his associates, and ridiculed the computer security community, claiming: "It used to be the security guys chasing the hackers. Now, it's the hackers chasing the security guys." Markoff published the claims in a follow-up article in March 1990.

== The raid and aftermath ==
In the early hours of 2 April 1990, Even-Chaim's home in Caulfield North, suburban Melbourne, was raided by the Australian Federal Police and he was arrested. Simultaneously, the AFP raided the homes of fellow Realm members Jones and Woodcock. Even-Chaim was charged with 48 offenses, most of which carried a maximum 10-year jail sentence. On 6 October 1993, Even-Chaim, who by then had negotiated a deal in which he would plead guilty if the number of charges was reduced to 15, was sentenced to 500 hours of community service, with a 12-month suspended jail term. Unlike his two co-accused, he had revealed little at his police interview or in court that might explain his motivation for his hacking.

Even-Chaim apparently worked in IT for at least some time after his conviction and has pursued an interest in music. Despite approaches by The Age newspaper in 2003 and the producer of a television documentary on The Realm, Even-Chaim has declined to discuss his hacking career.

== See also ==
- List of convicted computer criminals
