= Svechinsky =

Svechinsky (masculine), Svechinskaya (feminine), or Svechinskoye (neuter) may refer to:

- Svechinsky District, a district of Kirov Oblast, Russia
- Kristina Svechinskaya (b. 1989), former Russian money mule hacker
