= Spybot =

Spybot may refer to:

- Spybot – Search & Destroy, a spyware and adware removal computer program
- Spybot worm, a family of computer worms
