= R. Gary Klausner =

American judge (born 1941)

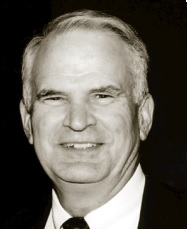
- circa 2002

Judge of the United States District Court for the Central District of California
- Incumbent
- Assumed office November 15, 2002
- Appointed by: George W. Bush
- Preceded by: William Duffy Keller

Judge of the Los Angeles County Superior Court
- In office 1985–2002
- Appointed by: George Deukmejian

Personal details
- Born: Robert Gary Klausner; 1941 (age 84–85) Los Angeles, California, U.S.
- Party: Republican
- Education: University of Notre Dame (BA, BS); Loyola Law School (JD)

Military service
- Allegiance: United States
- Branch/service: United States Army
- Years of service: 1967–1969
- Rank: Captain
- Battles/wars: Vietnam War

Robert Gary Klausner (born 1941) is an American judge who has been a United States district judge of the United States District Court for the Central District of California since 2002. He previously served on the Los Angeles County Superior Court.

== Early life and education ==
Klausner was born in Los Angeles, California in 1941. He graduated from Loyola High School. He received a Bachelor of Arts degree in 1963 and a Bachelor of Science degree in 1964 from the University of Notre Dame. He received his Juris Doctor from Loyola Law School in 1967.

== Career ==
Klausner served in the United States Army from 1967 to 1969, serving during the Vietnam War as a captain. He then was a deputy district attorney in the Los Angeles County District Attorney's Office from 1969 to 1974.

He served as a court commissioner of the Pasadena Municipal Court from 1974 to 1980. Governor Jerry Brown appointed him as a judge on the Pasadena Municipal Court in 1980. In 1985, Governor George Deukmejian elevated Klausner to the Los Angeles County Superior Court bench, where he served until 2002. Klausner became supervising judge of the Criminal Departments in 1991 and assistant presiding judge in 1993; he was presiding judge from 1995 to 1996. In this role, Klausner opposed a merger of the municipal and superior courts.

=== Federal judicial service ===
Klausner was nominated by President George W. Bush on July 18, 2002, to be a United States district judge of the United States District Court for the Central District of California to the seat vacated by William Duffy Keller. Klausner, a Republican, was recommended for the post by a unanimous vote of a local bipartisan committee that screens potential judicial nominees, and his nomination was uncontroversial. Klausner was rated "well qualified" by a substantial majority of the American Bar Association's Standing Committee on the Federal Judiciary. He was confirmed by the United States Senate on November 14, 2002, by voice vote, and received his commission the following day.

== Notable rulings ==
In 2006, Klausner presided over United States v. Ancheta, the federal prosecution of Jeanson James Ancheta of Downey, California, the first botnet-related prosecution in U.S. history. Following Ancheta's guilty plea, Klausner sentenced Ancheta to 57 months in prison for various botnet-related crimes. In 2016, Klausner presided over a copyright case filed by the estate of Spirit guitarist Randy Wolfe against Led Zeppelin founders Robert Plant and Jimmy Page. The estate of Wolfe alleged that Wolfe was entitled to a writing credit for the song "Stairway to Heaven"; Klausner ruled in April 2016 that a jury could find "substantial similarity" between the elements of the two songs. In another copyright case arising from the Star Trek fan film Prelude to Axanar, Klausner rejected various motions by both parties in January 2017, setting the stage for a civil trial on the matter to go forward. The parties settled the suit. In August 2017, Klausner dismissed a class-action lawsuit filed by boxing fans who contended that the 2015 Floyd Mayweather Jr. vs. Manny Pacquiao boxing match was deceptively marketed because Pacquiao failed to disclose a shoulder injury that affected his performance. Klausner ruled that fans of sporting events have no right to have the event meet their expectations for excitement. In October 2017, Klausner ruled in favor of the plaintiff Coachella Music Festival in a lawsuit against the fledgling "Filmchella" film festival, finding that the names were likely to cause consumer confusion.

On May 1, 2020, Klausner rejected a lawsuit by the United States women's national soccer team's for equal pay, ruling there was no genuine issue of material fact that they were discriminated against in pay.

A 2022 Klausner ruling dismissed a class-action suit against the FBI after the agency seized tens of millions of dollars in cash and valuables from hundreds of safe-deposit boxes. According to the LA Times, Klausner ruled that the raid "did not violate anyone’s constitutional rights" under the Fourth Amendment. The search warrant omitted FBI instructions which included "permanent confiscation of everything inside any box containing at least $5,000 in cash or goods, a senior FBI agent recently testified," the newspaper reported. A plaintiff in the suit said the ruling would “set a dangerous precedent that will allow the FBI and other law enforcement agencies to bypass the 4th Amendment,” which bars “unreasonable searches and seizures.” A panel of the 9th U.S. Circuit Court of Appeals unanimously overturned Klausner's ruling.

Legal offices
Preceded by William Duffy Keller	Judge of the United States District Court for the Central District of California; 2002–present	Incumbent
