= William Duffy Keller =

American judge (1934–2025)

William D. Keller

Senior Judge of the United States District Court for the Central District of California
- In office October 29, 1999 – November 2, 2025

Judge of the United States District Court for the Central District of California
- In office October 4, 1984 – October 29, 1999
- Appointed by: Ronald Reagan
- Preceded by: Seat established by 98 Stat. 333
- Succeeded by: R. Gary Klausner

United States Attorney for the Central District of California
- In office 1972–1977
- Appointed by: Richard Nixon
- Preceded by: Robert L. Meyer
- Succeeded by: Robert L. Brosio (acting)

Personal details
- Born: William Duffy Keller; October 29, 1934 Los Angeles, California, U.S.
- Died: November 2, 2025 (aged 91)
- Education: University of California, Berkeley (BS); UCLA School of Law (LLB)

William Duffy Keller (October 29, 1934 – November 2, 2025) was a United States district judge of the United States District Court for the Central District of California.

== Early life and career ==
Born in Los Angeles, California, Keller received a Bachelor of Science degree from the University of California, Berkeley in 1956 and a Bachelor of Laws from the UCLA School of Law in 1960. He was an Assistant United States Attorney of the Southern District of California from 1961 to 1964. He was in private practice in California from 1964 to 1972. He was the United States Attorney for the Central District of California from 1972 to 1977. He was in private practice in California from 1977 to 1984.

== Federal judicial service ==
Keller was nominated by President Ronald Reagan on September 11, 1984, to the United States District Court for the Central District of California, to a new seat created by 98 Stat. 333. He was confirmed by the United States Senate on October 3, 1984, and received his commission on October 4, 1984. He assumed senior status on October 29, 1999.

== Death ==
Keller died on November 2, 2025, at the age of 91.

== Sources ==
Legal offices
| Preceded by Seat established by 98 Stat. 333 | Judge of the United States District Court for the Central District of California; 1984–1999 | Succeeded by R. Gary Klausner |
