= Electron (computer hacker) =

Australian computer criminal (born 1969)

Richard Jones
- Born: June 1969 (age 57)
- Other names: Electron, Nom

Electron was the computer handle of Richard Jones, a member of an underground hacker community called The Realm. Jones, born in June 1969, was one of three members of the group arrested in simultaneous raids by the Australian Federal Police in Melbourne, Australia, on 2 April 1990. All three — Nahshon Even-Chaim (also known as Phoenix), Electron and Nom (real name David John Woodcock) — were convicted of a range of computer crimes involving the intrusion into US defense and government computer systems and the theft of an online computer security newsletter in the late 1980s and early 1990.

== Significance of case ==
The case was the first prosecution of hackers under Australian federal computer crime legislation that had come into law in June 1989. It was also the first time in the world police had gained a conviction using evidence obtained by the remote tapping of a computer. For six weeks before the raid, members of the AFP computer crime section had been capturing the online activity of the ringleader, Phoenix, in suburban Melbourne, from the police Telephone Intercept Branch in Canberra, 650 km away. His conversations with Electron and Nom, which were intercepted continuously for eight weeks before the raid, formed the basis of the evidence against both of Phoenix's co-offenders, as they freely discussed the targets of their hacking and bragged of their exploits.

Electron pleaded guilty to 14 offences and in June 1993 was given a suspended six-month jail sentence and 300 hours community service.

== Media ==
A 1997 book by Suelette Dreyfus, Underground: Tales of Hacking, Madness and Obsession on the Electronic Frontier, described the hackers' exploits; in 2005, former AFP computer crime investigator Bill Apro co-wrote a book, Hackers: The Hunt for Australia’s Most Infamous Computer Cracker, in which he told of the police investigation he led that resulted in their arrest. All three offenders are named in the book. Electron's story was also told in a dramatised documentary, In the Realm of the Hackers, which aired on Australia’s ABC Television in 2003.

== Personal life ==
Electron was friends with Julian Assange.

== See also ==
- List of convicted computer criminals
