= In the Realm of the Hackers =

In The Realm of the Hackers
- 'A wild ride that takes us headlong into the risky but intoxicating world of the computer underground.' Robert Damian, Sundance
- Directed by: Kevin Anderson ACS
- Written by: Kevin Anderson ACS
- Produced by: Franco di Chiera
- Starring: Dan Spielman; Nathan Phillips; Ernie Gray; Suelette Dreyfus
- Narrated by: Robert Menzies
- Cinematography: Kevin Anderson ACS
- Edited by: Uri Mizrahi
- Music by: Al Mullins, Janine de Lorenzo
- Distributed by: Film Australia
- Release date: 2003
- Running time: 55 minutes
- Country: Australia
- Language: English
- Budget: AU$400,000

In The Realm of the Hackers is a 2003 Australian documentary directed by Kevin Anderson about the prominent hacker community, centered in Melbourne, Australia in the late 1980s until early 1990. The storyline is centered on the Australian teenagers going by the hacker names "Electron" and "Phoenix", who were members of an elite computer hacking group called 'The Realm' and hacked into some of the most secure computer networks in the world, including those of the US Naval Research Laboratory, Lawrence Livermore National Laboratory, a government lab charged with the security of the US nuclear stockpile, and NASA. The film runs for 55 minutes and was inspired by the book Underground, by Melbourne-based writer and academic Suelette Dreyfus.

== See also ==
- Electron (computer hacker)
- Nahshon Even-Chaim
- Underground: Tales of Hacking, Madness and Obsession on the Electronic Frontier
- Hacktivism
