= Robert L. Meyer =

American attorney

United States Attorney for the Central District of California
- In office May 18, 1970 – January 1, 1972
- President: Richard Nixon
- Preceded by: William Matthew Byrne Jr.
- Succeeded by: William Duffy Keller

Personal details
- Born: September 12, 1923 Los Angeles, California
- Died: November 14, 1972 (aged 49) Santa Ana, California
- Education: University of Southern California, law degree

Robert L. Meyer (September 12, 1923 - November 14, 1972) was an American attorney, best known as the United States Attorney for the United States District Court for the Central District of California from May 1970 to January 1972, when he was forced to resign for pursuing matters which the Nixon administration did not like.

== Biography ==
Meyer was born in Los Angeles, and obtained a law degree from the University of Southern California and was admitted to the bar in 1949. A Republican, he unsuccessfully ran for California State Assembly in 1950 and 1956. In the 1956 race, he narrowly lost to future-Congressman Thomas M. Rees by 163 votes. Meyer was active in local Republican activities, and served as campaign manager for Senator George Murphy during most of his 1969-70 re-election campaign. Prior to that he also worked on Murphy's 1964 campaign and Nixon's presidential and gubernatorial campaigns. Murphy formally nominated Meyer to Nixon in 1970 for the U.S. Attorney position.

Meyer served as United States Attorney for Los Angeles (United States District Court for the Central District of California) from May 18, 1970, until he was forced to resign effective January 1, 1972. One factor in his leaving was his refusal to sign off on the prosecution of Daniel Ellsberg, who had released the Pentagon Papers. He claimed he was forced out for being told he was not a "true conservative". Some unnamed sources claimed that he lacked experience in litigation and was abrasive, but others strongly disagreed with these alleged complaints. Differences in philosophy were apparent during his tenure, however. Meyer had gained great disfavor with Republicans for prosecuting Los Angeles police officers, including for a botched raid in 1970 that led to the deaths of undocumented Mexicans, although that prosecution ended in an acquittal. Meyer also investigated police conduct concerning the death of journalist Ruben Salazar in 1970. Meyer reported that he was directed to resign in November 1971 by L. Patrick Gray, a U.S. Assistant Attorney General, on the orders of Attorney General John N. Mitchell.

After leaving the U.S. Attorney's office, Meyer returned to private practice. Less than a year later, he died of an apparent heart attack while driving, at age 49, on November 14, 1972. He was survived by his wife Mary Helen and two sons.
