= Raphael Gray =

British computer hacker (born 1981)

- Born: Lambeth, London
- Other names: Curador
- Occupation: Hacker
- Parent: Elizabeth von Hippel

Raphael Gray is a British computer hacker who, at the age of 19, hacked computer systems around the world over a period of six weeks as part of a multi-million pound credit card mission. He then proceeded to publish credit card details of over 6,500 cards as an example of weak security in the growing number of consumer websites.

== Biography ==
Gray was able to break into the secure systems using an £800 computer he bought in his home town Clynderwen, Pembrokeshire, Wales. After publishing the credit card info on his websites, Gray posted a personal message saying law enforcers would never find him "because they never catch anyone. The police can't hack their way out of a paper bag." He also sent Viagra tablets to Bill Gates' address and then published what he claimed to be the billionaire's own number.

He was tracked down by ex-hacker Chris Davis who was insulted by Gray's "arrogance". It took Davis under a day to find Gray's information, which he then forwarded to the FBI. "The FBI was actually quite easy to deal with, although technically, they didn't really understand what it was I was explaining to them. The local police were also very polite, but they didn't understand it", said Davis. Gray was arrested when FBI agents and officers from the local Dyfed Powys Police turned up at the door of his home, which he shared with his mother, brother and sister in March 2000.

== See also ==
- List of convicted computer criminals
