= The 414s =

Hacker group

The 414s were a group of computer hackers from Milwaukee who broke into dozens of high-profile computer systems, including ones at Los Alamos National Laboratory, Sloan-Kettering Cancer Center, and Security Pacific National Bank, in 1982 and 1983.

== History ==
They were eventually identified as six teenagers, taking their name after the IBM-sponsored Explorer Post in their hometown of Milwaukee, Wisconsin, which used the telephone area code 414. They ranged in age from 16 to 22 and many met in an Explorer Scout program sponsored by IBM.

The 414s were described as meeting the profile of computer hackers at the time: "Young, male, intelligent, highly motivated and energetic". Neal Patrick claimed his only motivation was the challenge of getting into places he was not supposed to, and remaining there undetected. Another member, Tim Winslow, began learning computers on a teletype his math teacher brought in to school.

News media described the group's penetration of systems at Los Alamos National Laboratory as "the 'WarGames' case", comparing it to the film released earlier that year. The 414s themselves were not entirely harmless, doing $1,500 worth of damage at Sloan-Kettering during their June 3, 1983 break-in by accidentally deleting billing records. Patrick and the 414s did cause real concern, as experts realized that others could duplicate their techniques and do real damage.

The systems they broke into were exclusively running Digital Equipment Corporation's (DEC's) VMS and RSTS/E operating systems. They used inexpensive personal computers, analog modems, and simple hacking techniques, such as using common or default passwords published in DEC's manufacturer guides to log in to various timeshare systems. The 414s exploited a lack of administrative oversight and password care for systems.

Among those reporting unusual hacking activities was Chen Chui, an administrator who discovered an electronic break-in, left a message for the intruders, and contacted the FBI, who placed wiretaps and eventually traced the calls back to Milwaukee. Gerald Wondra, 22 at the time, was the first visited by the FBI. Wondra lived with his mother in West Allis, a Milwaukee suburb. Wondra said he was "curious, he was just having fun".

== FBI investigation ==
The 414s were investigated and identified by the FBI in 1983; the investigation included installing data-capture equipment on their phone lines. Winslow (20), Wondra (21), and Patrick (17) were all visited by FBI agents. Most of the members of the 414s were not prosecuted, in various agreements to stop their activities and pay restitutions. Winslow, Wondra, and another defendant were charged and each pleaded guilty on two counts of "making harassing telephone calls". Patrick, due to being a minor, was not at risk for prosecution and used the public attention to appear on various television shows. A Freedom of Information Act request made to the FBI on November 8, 2020, returned as "No Responsive Documents".

== Media ==
During the widespread media coverage of the group, 17-year-old Neal Patrick, a student at Rufus King High School, emerged as its spokesman and an "instant celebrity" during the brief frenzy of interest, which included Patrick appearing on CBS Morning News, The Phil Donahue Show in August 1983, and appeared on the September 5, 1983 cover of Newsweek. During an appearance on NBC's The Today Show he was asked if he had regrets, to which he replied "In hindsight, I really wish that accessing those systems just wasn't so easy".

As a result of news coverage, congressman Dan Glickman called for an investigation and new laws about computer hacking. Neal Patrick testified before the U.S. House of Representatives on September 26, 1983, about the dangers of computer hacking, and six bills concerning computer crime were introduced in the House that year.

== Documentary ==
A documentary called The 414s: The Original Teenage Hackers premiered in competition at the 2015 Sundance Film Festival and was picked up for distribution by CNN. The film features present-day interviews with some of the original 414s as they reflect on the early days of hacking and the media attention that followed.
