= Jeanson James Ancheta =

Australian hacker

- Conviction: Pleaded guilty to four felony charges
- Penalty: 5 years in prison

On May 9, 2006, Jeanson James Ancheta became the first person to be charged for controlling large numbers of hijacked computers or botnets.

== Biography ==
Ancheta was going to Downey High School in Downey, California until 2001 when he dropped out of school. He later entered an alternative program for students with academic or behavioral problems. He worked at an Internet cafe and according to his family wanted to join the military reserves. Around June 2004 he started to work with botnets after discovering rxbot, a common computer worm that could spread his net of infected computers.

== Botnets ==
Botnet is a jargon term for a collection of software robots, or "bots", that run autonomously and automatically.

He hijacked somewhere in the area of half a million computer systems. This not only affected computers like the one in your home, but it allowed him and others to orchestrate large-scale attacks.

— US attorney's office in Los Angeles, Thom Mrozek

== Arrest and sentence ==
In November 2005 he was captured in an elaborate sting operation when FBI agents lured him to their local office on the pretext of collecting computer equipment. The arrest was part of the Operation: Bot Roast.

On May 9, 2006, Ancheta pleaded guilty to four felony charges of violating United States Code Section 1030, Fraud and Related Activity in Connection with Computers, specifically subsections (a)(5)(A)(i), 1030 (a)(5)(B)(i), and 1030(b). Ancheta was sentenced to 57 months in prison, and had to forfeit a 1993 BMW and more than $58,000 in profit. He also had to pay a restitution of $15,000 US to the U.S. federal government for infecting the military computers.

== See also ==
- List of convicted computer criminals
