= Zardoz (computer security) =

Mailing list run by Neil Gorsuch 1989 to 1991

In computer security, the Security-Digest list, better known as the Zardoz list, was a semi-private full disclosure mailing list run by Neil Gorsuch from 1989 through 1991. It identified weaknesses in systems and gave directions on where to find them. It was a perennial target for computer hackers, who sought archives of the list for information on undisclosed software vulnerabilities.

== Membership restrictions ==
Access to Zardoz was approved on a case-by-case basis by Gorsuch, principally by reference to the user account used to send subscription requests; requests were approved for root users, valid UUCP owners, or system administrators listed at the NIC.

The openness of the list to users other than Unix system administrators was a regular topic of conversation, with participants expressing concern that vulnerabilities and exploitation details disclosed on the list were liable to spread to hackers. The circulation of Zardoz postings was an open secret among computer hackers, and mocked in a Phrack parody of an IRC channel populated by security experts.

== Notable participants ==
- Keith Bostic discussed BSD Sendmail vulnerabilities
- Chip Salzenberg discussed Peter Honeyman's posting of a UUCP worm, and shell script security
- Gene Spafford discussed VMS and Ultrix bugs, and relayed law enforcement enquiries about the Morris Worm
- Tom Christiansen discussed SUID shell scripts
- Chris Torek discussed devising exploits from general descriptions of vulnerabilities
- Henry Spencer discussed Unix security
- Brendan Kehoe discussed systems security
- Alec Muffett announced Crack, the Unix password cracker

The majority of Zardoz participants were Unix systems administrators and C software developers. Neil Gorsuch and Gene Spafford were the most prolific contributors to the list.
