= DECnet =

Network protocol suite

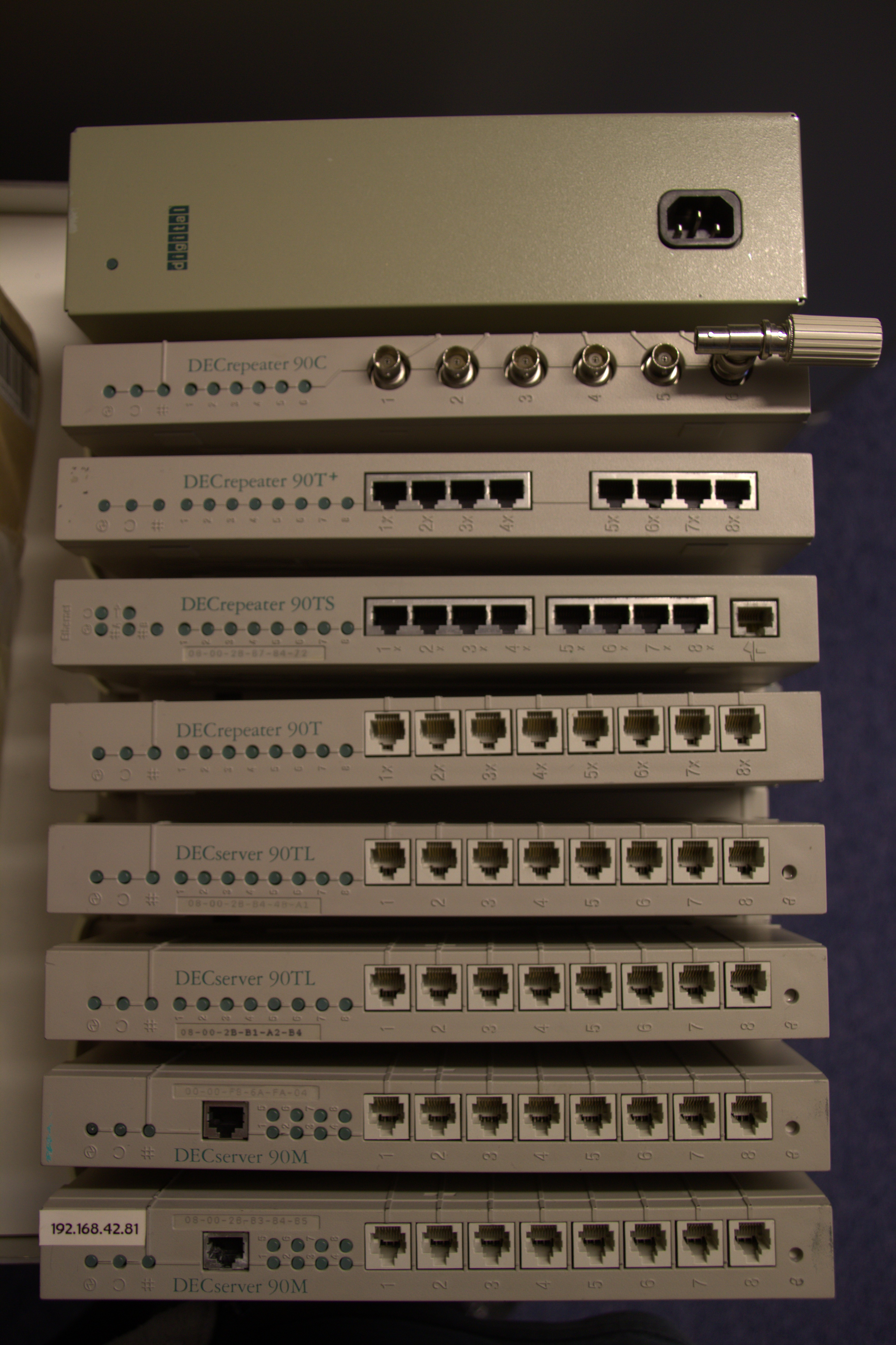
Stack of DECnet network equipment

DECnet is a suite of network protocols created by Digital Equipment Corporation. Originally released in 1975 in order to connect two PDP-11 minicomputers, it evolved into one of the first peer-to-peer network architectures, thus transforming DEC into a networking powerhouse in the 1980s. Initially built with three layers, it later (1982) evolved into a seven-layer OSI-compliant networking protocol.

DECnet was built right into the DEC flagship operating system OpenVMS since its inception. Later Digital ported it to Ultrix, OSF/1 (later Tru64) as well as Macintosh and IBM PC compatibles running variants of MS-DOS, OS/2, and Windows under the name PATHWORKS, allowing these systems to connect to DECnet networks of VAX machines as terminal nodes.

While the DECnet protocols were designed entirely by Digital Equipment Corporation, DECnet Phase II (and later) were open standards with published specifications, and several implementations were developed outside DEC, including ones for FreeBSD and Linux. DECnet code in the Linux kernel was marked as orphaned on February 18, 2010 and removed August 22, 2022.

== Evolution ==
DECnet refers to a specific set of hardware and software networking products which implement the DIGITAL Network Architecture (DNA). This architecture is set out in a number of documents which define the network architecture in general, state the specifications for each layer of the architecture, and describe the protocols which operate within each layer. Although network protocol analyzer tools tend to categorize all protocols from DIGITAL as "DECnet", strictly speaking, non-routed DIGITAL protocols such as LAT, SCS, AMDS, LAST/LAD are not DECnet protocols and are not part of the DIGITAL Network Architecture.

To trace the evolution of DECnet is to trace the development of DNA. The beginnings of DNA were in the early 1970s. DIGITAL published its first DNA specification at about the same time that IBM announced its Systems Network Architecture (SNA). Since that time, development of DNA has evolved through the following phases:

=== 1970–1980 ===
Phase I (1974) Support limited to two PDP-11s running the RSX-11 operating system, or a small number of PDP-8s running the RTS-8 operating system, with communication over point-to-point (DDCMP) links between nodes.

Phase II (1975) Support for networks of up to 32 nodes with multiple, different implementations which could inter-operate with each other. Implementations expanded to include RSTS, TOPS-10, TOPS-20 and VAX/VMS with communications between processors still limited to point-to-point links only. Introduction of downline loading (MOP), and file transfer using File Access Listener (FAL), remote file access using Data Access Protocol (DAP), task-to-task programming interfaces and network management features.

Phase III (1980). Support for networks of up to 255 nodes with 8-bit addresses, over point-to point and multi-drop links. Introduction of adaptive routing capability, record access, a network management architecture, and gateways to other types of networks including IBM's SNA and CCITT Recommendation X.25.

DECnet Phase IV protocol suite
Application	DAP: Data Access Protocol CTERM: Command Terminal
Network Management	NICE: Network Information (and) Control Exchange MOP: Maintenance Operations Protocol
Session	SCP: Session Control Protocol
Transport	NSP: Network Service Protocol
Network	DRP: DECnet Routing Protocol
Data link	DDCMP: Digital Data Communications Message Protocol; Ethernet, Token Ring, HDLC, FDDI, ...
Physical	Ethernet, Token Ring, FDDI, ...

=== 1981–1986 ===
Phase IV and Phase IV+ (1982). Phase IV was released initially to RSX-11 and VMS systems, later TOPS-20, TOPS-10, ULTRIX, VAXELN, and RSTS/E gained support. Support for networks of up to 64,449 nodes (63 areas of 1023 nodes) with 16-bit addresses, datalink capabilities expanded beyond DDCMP to include Ethernet local area network support as the datalink of choice, expanded adaptive routing capability to include hierarchical routing (areas, level 1 and level 2 routers), VMScluster support (cluster alias) and host services (CTERM). CTERM allowed a user on one computer to log into another computer remotely, performing the same function that Telnet does in the TCP/IP protocol stack. Digital also released a product called the PATHWORKS client, and more commonly known as the PATHWORKS 32 client, that implemented much of DECnet Phase IV for DOS, and 16 and 32 bit Microsoft Windows platforms (all the way through to Windows Server 2003).

Phase IV implemented an 8 layer architecture similar to the OSI (7 layer) model especially at the lower levels. Since the OSI standards were not yet fully developed at the time, many of the Phase IV protocols remained proprietary.

The Ethernet implementation was unusual in that the software changed the physical address of the Ethernet interface on the network to AA-00-04-00-xx-yy where xx-yy reflected the DECnet network address of the host. This allowed ARP-less LAN operation because the LAN address could be deduced from the DECnet address. This precluded connecting two NICs from the same DECnet node onto the same LAN segment, however.

The initial implementations released were for VAX/VMS and RSX-11, later this expanded to virtually every operating system DIGITAL ever shipped with the notable exception of RT-11. DECnet stacks are found on Linux, SunOS and other platforms, and Cisco and other network vendors offer products that can cooperate with and operate within DECnet networks. Full DECnet Phase IV specifications are available.

At the same time that DECnet Phase IV was released, the company also released a proprietary protocol called LAT for serial terminal access via Terminal servers. LAT shared the OSI physical and datalink layers with DECnet and LAT terminal servers used MOP for the server image download and related bootstrap processing.

Enhancements made to DECnet Phase IV eventually became known as DECnet Phase IV+, although systems running this protocol remained completely interoperable with DECnet Phase IV systems.

=== 1987 & beyond ===
Phase V and Phase V+ (1987). Support for very large (architecturally unlimited) networks, a new network management model, local or distributed name service, improved performance over Phase IV. Move from a proprietary network to an Open Systems Interconnection (OSI) by integration of ISO standards to provide multi-vendor connectivity and compatibility with DNA Phase IV, the last two features resulted in a hybrid network architecture (DNA and OSI) with separate "towers" sharing an integrated transport layer. Transparent transport level links to TCP/IP were added via the IETF RFC 1006 (OSI over IP) and RFC 1859 (NSP over IP) standards (see diagram).

It was later renamed DECnet/OSI to emphasize its OSI interconnectability, and subsequently DECnet-Plus as TCP/IP protocols were incorporated.

== Notable installations ==
=== DEC Easynet ===
DEC's internal corporate network was a DECnet network called Easynet, which had evolved from DEC's Engineering Net (E-NET). It included over 2,000 nodes as of 1984, 15,000 nodes (in 39 countries) as of 1987, and 54,000 nodes as of 1990.

=== The DECnet Internet ===
DECnet was used at various scientific research centers which linked their networks to form an international network called the DECnet Internet. This included the U.S. Space Physics Analysis Network (US-SPAN), the European Space Physics Analysis Network (E-SPAN), Energy Sciences Network, and other research and education networks. The network consisted of over 17,000 nodes as of 1989. Routing between networks with different address spaces involved the use of either "poor man's routing" (PMR) or address translation gateways. In December 1988, VAX/VMS hosts on the DECnet Internet were attacked by the Father Christmas worm.

=== CCNET ===
CCNET (Computer Center Network) was a DECnet network that connected the campuses of various universities in the eastern regions of the United States during the 1980s. A key benefit was the sharing of systems software developed by the operations staff at the various sites, all of which were using a variety of DEC computers. As of March 1983, it included Columbia University, Carnegie Mellon University, and Case Western Reserve University. By May 1986, New York University, Stevens Institute of Technology, Vassar College and Oberlin College had been added. Several other universities joined later.

=== Hobbyist DECnet networks ===
Hobbyist DECnet networks have been in use during the 21st century. These include:

- HECnet
- Italian Retro DECnet

== See also ==
- Protocol Wars
