= HEPnet =

HEPnet or the High-Energy Physics Network is a telecommunications network for researchers in high-energy physics. It originated in the United States, but has spread to - or been connected with - most places involved in such research, including Japan, Europe, and Canada, amongst other places. Well-known mainland US sites include Argonne National Laboratory, Brookhaven National Laboratory and Lawrence Berkeley.

== See also ==
- Energy Sciences Network
