= Kristina Svechinskaya =

Russian computer criminal (born 1989)

Kristina Vladimirovna Svechinskaya
- Born: February 16, 1989 (age 37)
- Occupation: money mule

Kristina Vladimirovna Svechinskaya (Russian: Кристина Владимировна Свечинская, born February 16, 1989) is a former Russian money mule hacker. While studying at New York University, in 2010 she was accused of a plot to defraud British and U.S. banks and usage of false passports. According to charges, Svechinskaya used a Zeus Trojan horse to attack thousands of bank accounts and opened at least five accounts in Bank of America and Wachovia, which received $35,000 (£22,000) of stolen money. It is estimated that with nine other people, Svechinskaya had skimmed $3 million in total. Svechinskaya was dubbed by the media "the world's sexiest computer hacker" for her raunchy but casual appearance and was compared to Anna Chapman. The upcoming Russian film Botnet is partially based on Svechinskaya's story.

== Early life ==
Fluent in English, Svechinskaya originally studied at Stavropol State University. According to Svechinskaya's mother, after the death of Kristina's father their family was living on a 12,000 ruble (US$400 at the time) salary. In her third year, Kristina chose the Work & Travel program and in the summer of 2010 arrived in Massachusetts, where she started to work in a fast food outlet.

== Hacker ==
Her earnings were small and she moved to New York and worked as a hacker's money mule. Svechinskaya was offered an 8–10% share of taken money. Her sentence was expected to be announced in June 2011, but Svechinskaya signed a personal recognizance bond and was released under $25,000 bail. In case of conviction, Svechinskaya could have been imprisoned for up to 40 years. This would have included the fraud charge (30 years and $1 million fine) and the false passports charge (10 years and $250,000 fine). In 2016, Svechinskaya made a YouTube presentation of Flashsafe, marketed as secure cloud-based USB flash drive to store unlimited amount of data.
