= Suelette Dreyfus =

Australian researcher and journalist

- Occupations: Researcher, journalist, writer
- Notable work: Underground

Suelette Dreyfus is an Australian technology researcher, journalist, and academic. She is a lecturer in the Department of Computing and Information Systems at the University of Melbourne, as well as the principal researcher on the impact of digital technologies on whistleblowing as a form of freedom of expression. Her research includes information systems, digital security, privacy, and the impact of technology on whistleblowing, health informatics and e-education.

== Career ==
Dreyfus' work in e-health has focused on the patient information experience in the health system and the role of technology in error incident reporting in hospital settings. She has co-invented prototypes in information design for pathology reports with the aim of allowing doctors to improve communication with patients and families regarding the status of their diseases in progressive and chronic illnesses such as diabetes.

Her research in education has focused on using social media to teach foreign language to English-speaking primary school students, particularly for difficult languages that require more hours of practice such as Asian languages.

Dreyfus has written on the importance of protecting Freedom of Information access (FOI), the problems of information asymmetry and "tool asymmetry" between the individual citizen and the state, and the trend of "security clearance creep". She was a member of the WikiLeaks advisory board.

Her essays have also appeared in The Conversation, discussing the importance of protecting public access to strong encryption, the need for legal protections for whistleblowers, and the security paradox of legislation enforcing retention of metadata for two years for everyone in Australia.

=== Underground ===
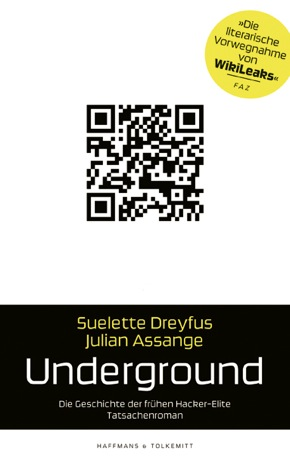
German cover from Underground (2011)

She is the author of the 1997 book Underground: Hacking, Madness and Obsession on the Electronic Frontier. The book describes the exploits of a group of Australian, American, and British hackers during the late 1980s and early 1990s, among them Julian Assange who is credited as a researcher for the book. Dreyfus released it in e-version in 2001 for free.

Dreyfus was an Associate Producer and interview subject for the documentary In the Realm of the Hackers, inspired by Underground, in 2003.
