= List of charges in United States v. Manning =

United States v. Manning is the court-martial case involving United States Army Private First Class Bradley Manning (now known as Chelsea Manning), who delivered U.S. government documents to persons not authorized to receive them in 2009 and 2010. Media reports said that the receiver was Julian Assange of WikiLeaks. Manning was arrested in May 2010 and a court-martial was held in June–August 2013. The charges were related to events which occurred "at or near" Contingency Operating Station Hammer, Iraq, in 2009 and 2010.

== Charges ==
=== By code violation ===
The charges were:

- UCMJ 104 (Aiding the enemy): 1 count
- UCMJ 92 (Failure to obey a lawful order or regulation): 9 counts. Mostly related to computers
  - Army Regulation 25–2, para. 4-5(a)(3): Modifying or installing unauthorized software to a system, using it for 'unintended' purposes
  - Army Regulation 25–2, para. 4-5(a)(4): Circumventing security mechanisms
  - Army Regulation 25–2, para. 4-6(k): Forbids transferring classified or sensitive information to non-secure systems
  - Army Regulation 380-5: Improper storage of classified information
- UCMJ 134 (General article): 24 counts. These counts incorporate statutes from the United States Code:
  - 18 U.S.C. § 641: Embezzlement and Theft of Public Money, Property or Records. The government said the records that Manning transferred were 'things of value'.
  - 18 U.S.C. § 793(e): This is part of the Espionage Act. The law forbids 'unauthorized persons' from taking 'national defense' information and either 'retaining' it or delivering it to 'persons not entitled to receive it'.
  - 18 U.S.C. § 1030(a) 1 and 2: These are from the Computer Fraud and Abuse Act of 1986. Section 1030(a)(1) is sometimes called the 'Computer Espionage' law as it borrows from the Espionage Act.

Total: 34

=== Listed by document ===
Most of the charges are related to the transfer of documents to another party. These documents are:

- The 2007 July 12 Baghdad airstrike video
- various groups of US State Department cables, unclassified and classified
- The "Reykjavik 13" US State Department cable
- Records from the CIDNEI database
- Records from the CIDNEA database
- A Microsoft PowerPoint presentation
- Records from a US Southern Command database
- Files "BE22 PAX.zip" and "BE22 PAX.wmv"
- United States Forces – Iraq email address list
- a record from United States Army Intelligence and Security Command
- A memorandum from an intelligence agency

According to news reports, many of the documents are the same as documents published by WikiLeaks, including:

- The July 12, 2007, Baghdad airstrike ("Collateral Murder") video
- United States diplomatic cables leak
- The Reykjavic 13 cable
- Iraq War documents leak (CIDNEI)
- Afghan War documents leak (CIDNEA)
- Granai airstrike video (BE22 PAX) (alleged by Wired and Marcy Wheeler)

=== Listed in the order given on the charge sheets ===
==== First set of charges (2010) ====
The first set of charges came on July 5, 2010. The Specifications (Spec.) are listed below in the same order as given on the charge sheets. To the right of each specification is a description of the related documents or actions.

===== Charge 1: Violation of UCMJ Article 92 (Failure to obey a lawful order or regulation) =====
- Spec. 1: Army Reg. 25–2, para. 4-6(k): The 2007 July 12 Baghdad video
- Spec. 2: Army Reg. 25–2, para. 4-6(k): 50 classified US Dept of State cables
- Spec. 3: Army Reg. 25–2, para. 4-6(k): A classified Microsoft Office PowerPoint presentation
- Spec. 4: Army Reg. 25–2, para. 4-5(a)(3): Adding unauthorized software to SIPRNet

===== Charge 2: Violation of UCMJ Article 134 (General article) =====
- Spec. 1: 18 U.S.C. § 793(e): The 2007 July 12 Baghdad video
- Spec. 2: 18 U.S.C. § 1030(a)(1): The 2007 July 12 Baghdad video
- Spec. 3: 18 U.S.C. § 1030(a)(1): The classified US State Dept Cable named "Reykjavik 13"
- Spec. 4: 18 U.S.C. § 1030(a)(1): 50 classified US State Dept cables
- Spec. 5: 18 U.S.C. § 1030(a)(2): The 2007 July 12 Baghdad video
- Spec. 6: 18 U.S.C. § 1030(a)(2): The classified US State Dept Cable named "Reykjavik 13"
- Spec. 7: 18 U.S.C. § 1030(a)(2): 150,000 diplomatic cables
- Spec. 8: 18 U.S.C. § 1030(a)(2): A classified Microsoft Office PowerPoint presentation

==== Second set of charges (2011) ====
A second set of charges was presented on March 1, 2011, and are as follows:

===== Additional Charge 1: Violation of UCMJ Article 104 (Aiding the enemy) =====
- Spec. 1: Knowingly giving intelligence to the enemy through indirect means

===== Additional Charge 2: Violation of UCMJ Article 134 (General article) =====
- Spec. 1: (statute not given): Causing intelligence to be published, knowing that it is accessible to the enemy
- Spec. 2: 18 U.S.C. § 793(e): A file named "12 JUL 07 CZ ENGAGEMENT ZONE 30 GC Anyone.avi"
- Spec. 3: 18 U.S.C. § 793(e): Memorandi from a US intelligence agency
- Spec. 4: 18 U.S.C. § 641: 380,000 records from the CIDNEI database
- Spec. 5: 18 U.S.C. § 793(e): >20 records from the CIDNEI database
- Spec. 6: 18 U.S.C. § 641: >90,000 records from the CIDNEA database
- Spec. 7: 18 U.S.C. § 793(e): >20 records from the CIDNEA database
- Spec. 8: 18 U.S.C. § 641: >700 records from a US Southern Command database
- Spec. 9: 18 U.S.C. § 793(e): >3 records from a US Southern Command database
- Spec. 10: 18 U.S.C. § 793(e): >5 records relating to an operation in Farah Province, Afghanistan
- Spec. 11: 18 U.S.C. § 793(e): The files "BE22 PAX.zip" and "BE22 PAX.wmv"
- Spec. 12: 18 U.S.C. § 641: 250,000 records from the State Dept Net-Centric Diplomacy database
- Spec. 13: 18 U.S.C. § 1030(a)(1): >75 US State Dept cables
- Spec. 14: 18 U.S.C. § 1030(a)(1): The State Dept cable named "Reykjavik-13"
- Spec. 15: 18 U.S.C. § 793(e): A record of a US Army Intelligence organization
- Spec. 16: 18 U.S.C. § 641: The US Forces – Iraq Microsoft Outlook / SharePoint Exchange Server global address list

===== Additional Charge 3: Violation of UCMJ Article 92 (Failure to obey a lawful order or regulation) =====
- Spec. 1: Army Reg. 25–2, para. 4-5(a)(4): Bypassing security mechanisms
- Spec. 2: Army Reg. 25–2, para. 4-5(a)(3): Adding unauthorized software to a SIPRNet computer
- Spec. 3: Army Reg. 25–2, para. 4-5(a)(3): Adding unauthorized software to a SIPRNet computer
- Spec. 4: Army Reg. 25–2, para. 4-5(a)(3): Using an information system for other than its intended purpose
- Spec. 5: Army Reg. 380–5, para. 7-4: Wrongfully storing classified information

== See also ==
- McCarran Internal Security Act/Subversive Activities Control Act of 1950
- USA Patriot Act
