= Keith B. Alexander =

Former Director of the United States National Security Agency

Keith Alexander
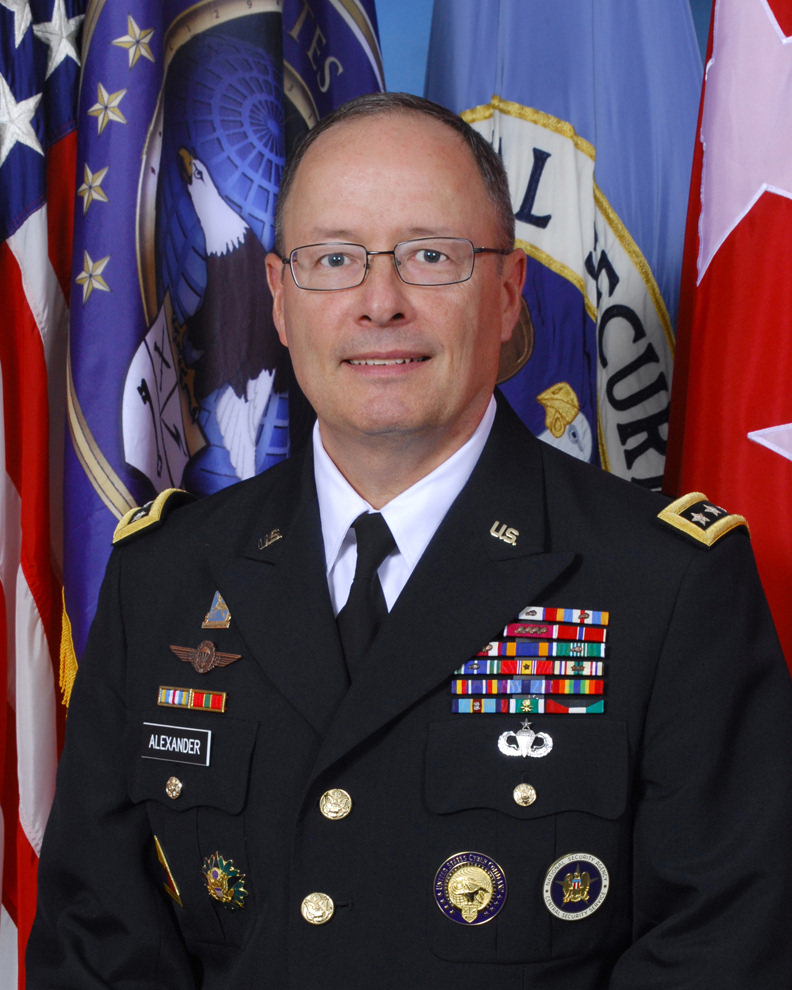
- Official portrait, 2013

1st Commander of United States Cyber Command (CYBERCOM)
- In office 21 May 2010 – 28 March 2014
- President: Barack Obama
- Preceded by: Position established
- Succeeded by: Michael S. Rogers

16th Director of the National Security Agency
- In office 1 August 2005 – 28 March 2014
- President: George W. Bush; Barack Obama
- Deputy: John C. Inglis
- Preceded by: Michael Hayden
- Succeeded by: Michael S. Rogers

Personal details
- Born: 2 December 1951 (age 74) Syracuse, New York, U.S.
- Spouse: Deborah Lynn Douglas
- Education: United States Military Academy (BS); Boston University (MS); Naval Postgraduate School (MS); National Defense University (MS, MS)

Military service
- Allegiance: United States
- Branch/service: United States Army
- Years of service: 1974–2014
- Rank: General
- Commands: United States Cyber Command; National Security Agency
- Battles/wars: Gulf War
- Awards: Defense Distinguished Service Medal; Army Distinguished Service Medal (2); Defense Superior Service Medal (2); Legion of Merit (5); Bronze Star Medal
- Keith B. Alexander's voice Alexander testifies at a Senate Appropriations Committee hearing on cybersecurity preparation and response Recorded June 12, 2013

Keith Brian Alexander (born 2 December 1951) is a retired four-star general of the United States Army, who served as director of the National Security Agency, chief of the Central Security Service, and commander of the United States Cyber Command (CYBERCOM). He previously served as Deputy Chief of Staff, G-2 (Intelligence), United States Army from 2003 to 2005. He assumed the positions of Director of the National Security Agency and Chief of the Central Security Service on 1 August 2005, and the additional duties as Commander United States Cyber Command on 21 May 2010.

Alexander announced his retirement on 16 October 2013. His retirement date was 28 March 2014. In May 2014, Alexander founded IronNet Cybersecurity, a private-sector cybersecurity firm based in Fulton, Maryland. He would leave the company in February 2024.

== Early life and education ==
Alexander was born on 2 December 1951, in Syracuse, New York, the son of Charlotte L. (Colvin) and Donald Henry Alexander. He was raised in Onondaga Hill, New York, a suburb of Syracuse. He was a paperboy for The Post-Standard and attended Westhill Senior High School, where he ran track.

Alexander attended the United States Military Academy at West Point, and in his class were three other future four-star generals: David Petraeus, Martin Dempsey and Walter L. Sharp. In April 1974, Alexander married Deborah Lynn Douglas, who was a classmate in high school and who grew up near his family in Onondaga Hill. They had four daughters.

Alexander entered active duty at West Point, intending to serve for only five years. Alexander's military education includes the Armor Officer Basic Course, the Military Intelligence Officer Advanced Course, the United States Army Command and General Staff College, and the National War College.

Alexander worked on signals intelligence at a number of secret National Security Agency bases in the United States and Germany. He earned a Master of Science in business administration in 1978 from Boston University, a Master of Science in systems technology (electronic warfare) and a Master in Science in physics in 1983 from the Naval Postgraduate School, and a Master of Science in national security strategy from the National Defense University. He rose quickly up the military ranks, due to his expertise in advanced technology and his competency at administration.

== Military career ==
Jessica L. Tozer sits down with NSA Director and CYBERCOM Commander General Keith Alexander to provide the NSA's point of view regarding its most criticized foreign intelligence and cybersecurity programs. (32:45min)

Alexander's assignments include the Deputy Chief of Staff (DCS, G-2), Headquarters, Department of the Army, Washington, D.C., from 2003 to 2005; Commanding General of the United States Army Intelligence and Security Command at Fort Belvoir, Virginia, from 2001 to 2003; Director of Intelligence (J-2), United States Central Command, MacDill Air Force Base, Florida, from 1998 to 2001; and Deputy Director for Intelligence (J-2) for the Joint Chiefs of Staff from 1997 to 1998. Alexander served in a variety of command assignments in Germany and the United States. These include tours as Commander of Border Field Office, 511th MI Battalion, 66th MI Group; 336th Army Security Agency Company, 525th MI Group; 204th MI Battalion; and 525th Military Intelligence Brigade.

Additionally, Alexander held key staff assignments as Deputy Director and Operations Officer, Executive Officer, 522nd MI Battalion, 2nd Armored Division; G-2 for the 1st Armored Division both in Germany and during the Gulf War, in Operation Desert Shield and Operation Desert Storm, in Saudi Arabia. He also served in Afghanistan on a peace keeping mission for the Army Deputy Chief of Staff for Intelligence.

Alexander headed the Army Intelligence and Security Command, where in 2001 he was in charge of 10,700 spies and eavesdroppers worldwide. In the words of James Bamford, who wrote his biography for Wired, "Alexander and the rest of the American intelligence community suffered a devastating defeat when they were surprised by the attacks on 9/11." Alexander's reaction was to order his intercept operators to begin to monitor the email and phone calls of American citizens who were unrelated to terrorist threats, including the personal calls of journalists.

In 2003, Alexander was named deputy chief of staff for intelligence for the United States Army. The 205th MI Brigade involved in the Abu Ghraib torture and prisoner abuse in Baghdad, Iraq was part of V Corps (US) and not under Alexander's command. Testifying to the Senate Armed Services Committee, Alexander called the abuse "totally reprehensible" and described the perpetrators as a "group of undisciplined MP soldiers". Mary Louise Kelly, who interviewed him later for NPR, said that because he was "outside the chain of command that oversaw interrogations in Iraq", Alexander was able to survive with his "reputation intact".

In 2004, along with Alberto Gonzales and others in the George W. Bush administration, Alexander presented a memorandum that sought to justify the treatment of those who were deemed "unlawful enemy combatants".

In June 2013, the National Security Agency was revealed by whistle-blower Edward Snowden to be secretly spying on the American people with FISA-approved surveillance programs, such as PRISM and XKeyscore.

On 16 October 2013, it was publicly announced that Alexander and his deputy, Chris Inglis were leaving the NSA.

On 13 April 2016, President Obama announced Alexander as a member of his Commission on Enhancing National Cybersecurity.

=== NSA appointment ===
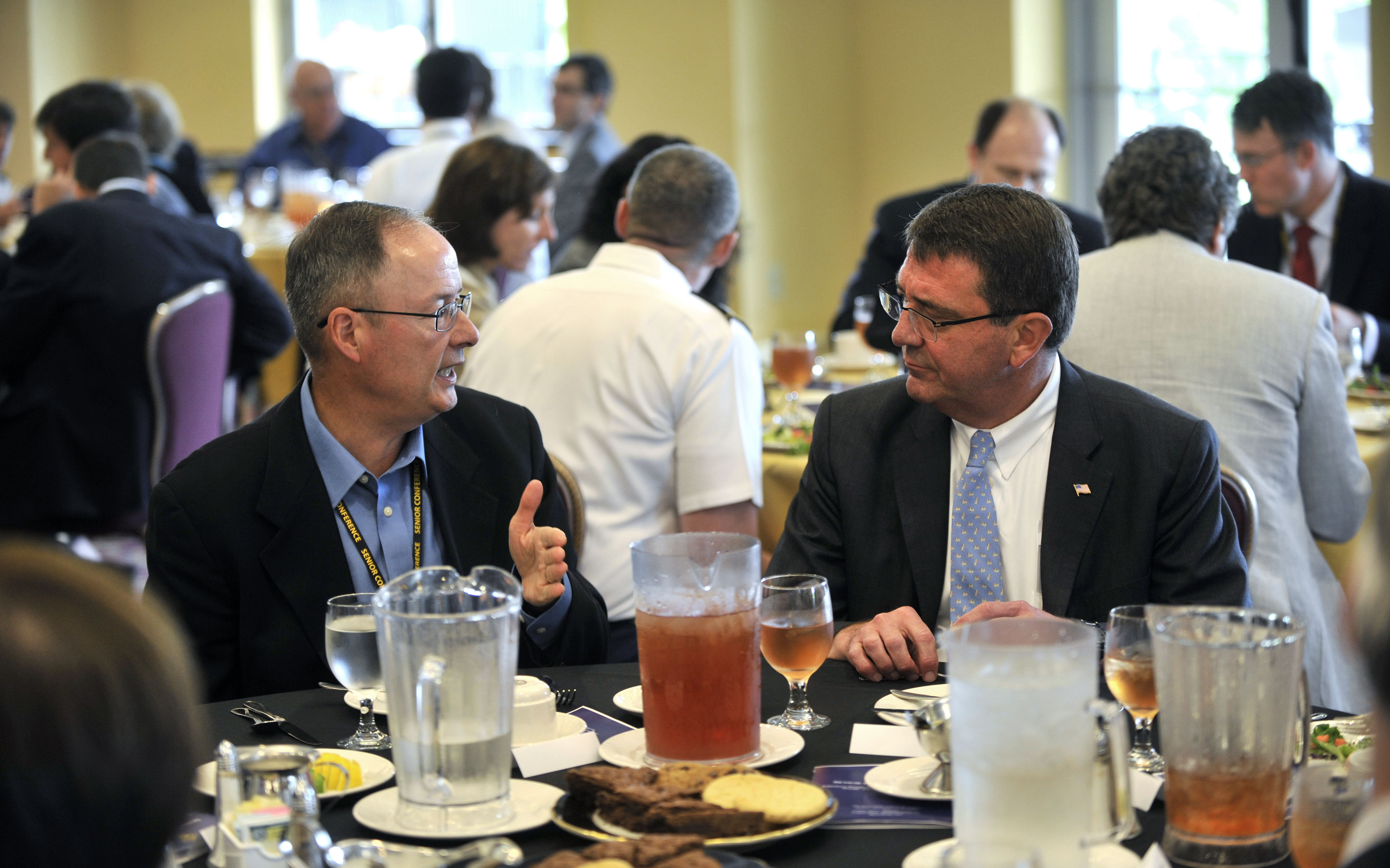
Alexander talks to Deputy Secretary of Defense Ash Carter, June 2012

In 2005, secretary of defense Donald Rumsfeld named Alexander, then a three-star general, as Director of the National Security Agency. There, according to Bamford, Alexander deceived the House Intelligence Committee when his agency was involved in warrantless wiretapping. Also during this period, Alexander oversaw the implementation of the Real Time Regional Gateway in Iraq, an NSA data collection program that consisted of gathering all electronic communication, storing it, and then searching and otherwise analyzing it. A former senior U.S. intelligence agent described Alexander's program: "Rather than look for a single needle in the haystack, his approach was, 'Let's collect the whole haystack. Collect it all, tag it, store it ... And whatever it is you want, you go searching for it."

By 2008, the Regional Gateway was effective in providing information about Iraqi insurgents who had eluded less comprehensive techniques. This "collect it all" strategy introduced by Keith Alexander is believed by Glenn Greenwald of The Guardian to be the model for the comprehensive world-wide mass archiving of communications which NSA had become engaged in by 2013.

According to Siobhan Gorman of The Wall Street Journal, a government official stated that Alexander offered to resign after the 2013 global surveillance disclosures first broke out in June 2013, but that the Obama administration asked him not to.

=== Cyber command ===
Alexander was confirmed by the United States Senate for appointment to the rank of general on May 7, 2010, and was officially promoted to that rank in a ceremony on 21 May 2010. Alexander assumed command of United States Cyber Command in the same ceremony that made him a four-star general.

Alexander delivered the keynote address at Black Hat USA in July 2013. The organizers describe Alexander as an advocate of "battlefield visualization and 'data fusion' for more useful intelligence". He provided them with this quote:

As our dependence on information networks increases, it will take a team to eliminate vulnerabilities and counter the ever-growing threats to the network. We can succeed in securing it by building strong partnerships between and within the private and public sectors, encouraging information sharing and collaboration, and creating and leveraging the technology that affords us the opportunity to secure cyberspace ...

=== Statements to the public regarding NSA operations ===
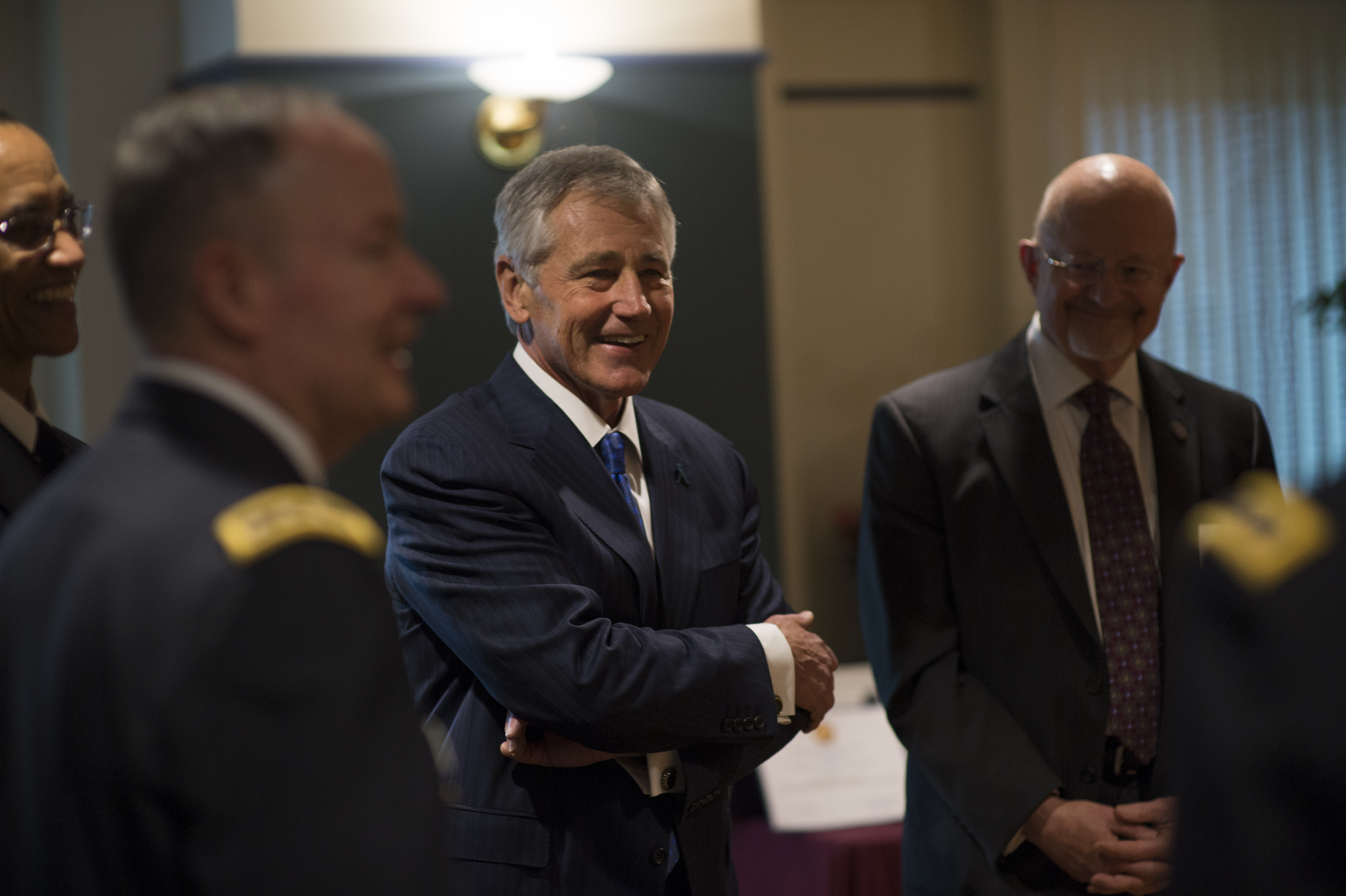
Alexander (left) with Secretary of Defense Chuck Hagel and DNI James Clapper at Alexander's retirement ceremony in 2014

Alexander gave the most comprehensive interview of his career, which spanned around 17,000 words, on 8 May 2014 to the Australian Financial Review journalist Christopher Joye, which was subsequently cited by Edward Snowden. The full transcript, which covers NSA operations, Snowden, the metadata debates, encryption controversies, and Chinese and Russian spying, has been published online. On Snowden, Alexander told Joye: "I suspect Russian intelligence are driving what he does. Understand as well that they're only going to let him do those things that benefit Russia, or stand to help improve Snowden's credibility". Wired magazine said that the AFR interview with Alexander showed that he was defending the stockpiling of zero-days, while The Wall Street Journal and other media focused upon Alexander's claims about Snowden working for Russian intelligence. In July 2012, in response to a question from Jeff Moss, the founder of the DEF CON hacker convention, "... does the NSA really keep a file on everyone?", Alexander replied, "No, we don't. Absolutely no. And anybody who would tell you that we're keeping files or dossiers on the American people knows that's not true."

In March 2012, in response to questions from Representative Hank Johnson during a United States Congress hearing about allegations made by former NSA officials that the NSA engages in collection of voice and digital information of U.S. citizens, Alexander said that, despite the allegations of "James Bashford" [sic] in Wired magazine, the NSA does not collect that data.

On 9 July 2012, when asked by a member of the press if a large data center in Utah was used to store data on American citizens, Alexander stated, "No. While I can't go into all the details on the Utah Data Center, we don't hold data on U.S. citizens."

At DEF CON 2012, Alexander was the keynote speaker; during the question and answers session, in response to the question "Does the NSA really keep a file on everyone, and if so, how can I see mine?" Alexander replied "Our job is foreign intelligence" and that "Those who would want to weave the story that we have millions or hundreds of millions of dossiers on people, is absolutely false ... From my perspective, this is absolute nonsense."

On 6 June 2013, the day after Snowden's revelations, then-Director of National Intelligence James Clapper released a statement admitting the NSA collects telephony metadata on millions of Americans telephone calls. This metadata information included originating and terminating telephone number, telephone calling card number, IMEI number, time and duration of phone calls.

Andy Greenberg of Forbes said that NSA officials, including Alexander, in the years 2012 and 2013 "publicly denied—often with carefully hedged words—participating in the kind of snooping on Americans that has since become nearly undeniable." In September 2013, Alexander was asked by Senator Mark Udall if it is the goal of the NSA to "collect the phone records of all Americans", to which Alexander replied:

Yes, I believe it is in the nation's best interest to put all the phone records into a lockbox that we could search.

=== Retirement ===
Alexander announced his retirement on October 16, 2013. His retirement date was March 28, 2014, and his replacement was U.S. Navy Vice Admiral Michael S. Rogers.

== Founder (and former CEO) of IronNet ==
In May 2014, after his retirement from NSA, Alexander founded IronNet Cybersecurity. IronNet provides cybersecurity coverage for private-sector companies using its IronDefense program and a team of cybersecurity analysts and experts. The company is headquartered in Fulton, Maryland, with offices in Frederick, Maryland, McLean, Virginia, and New York City. In October 2015, IronNet received $32.5 million in funding from Trident Capital Cybersecurity (now ForgePoint Capital) and Kleiner Perkins Caufield & Byers in a Series A investment. In May 2018, IronNet raised an additional $78 million in a round led by C5 Capital alongside existing investors ForgePoint Capital and Kleiner Perkins Caufield & Byers. In August 2021, IronNet went public on the New York Stock Exchange (NYSE) via a SPAC merger with LGL Systems Acquisition Corp. Alexander was later replaced by Linda Zecher on 12 July 2023, as CEO of IronNet. After two years of going public, IronNet announced it will be delisted from the NYSE in August 2023 leaving all retail investors with worthless shares.

In early October 2024 the AP reported that an investment bank had approached over 100 prospective buyers for the company, citing federal records, but none of them made an offer.

== Amazon appointment ==
Alexander joined Amazon's board of directors, as revealed in an SEC filing on 9 September 2020.

== Awards and decorations ==
=== Medals and ribbons ===
Defense Distinguished Service Medal
Army Distinguished Service Medal with oak leaf cluster
Defense Superior Service Medal with oak leaf cluster
Legion of Merit with four oak leaf clusters
Bronze Star Medal
Meritorious Service Medal with four oak leaf clusters
Air Medal
Army Commendation Medal with oak leaf cluster
Army Achievement Medal with oak leaf cluster
Joint Meritorious Unit Award
Army Superior Unit Award
National Intelligence Distinguished Service Medal
National Defense Service Medal with bronze service star
Southwest Asia Service Medal with 2 bronze service stars
Humanitarian Service Medal
Army Service Ribbon
Army Overseas Service Ribbon with bronze award numeral 2
Royal Norwegian Order of Merit (Commander with Cross)
Kuwait Liberation Medal (Saudi Arabia)
Kuwait Liberation Medal (Kuwait)

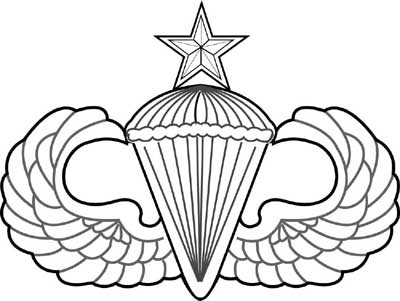
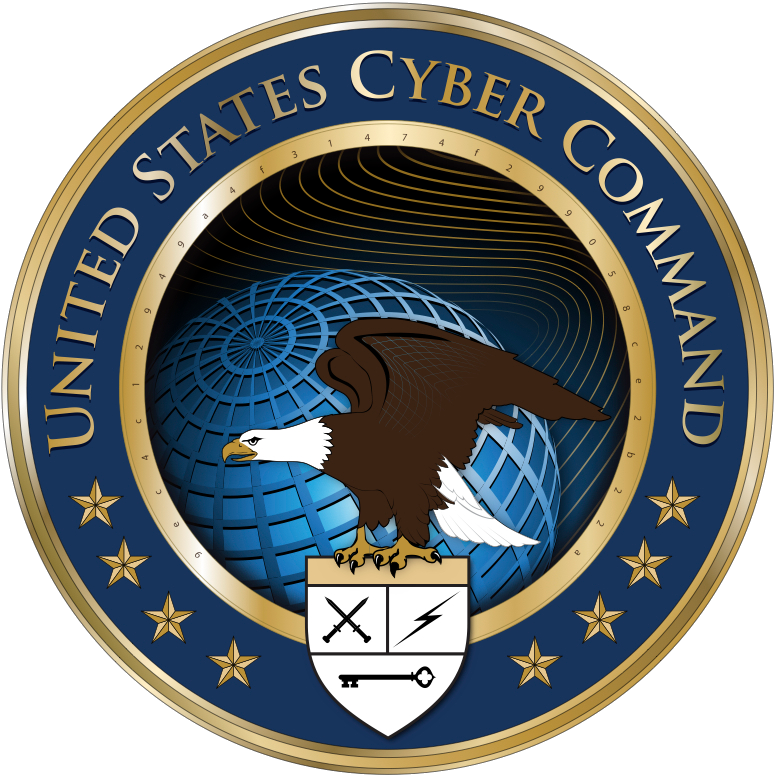
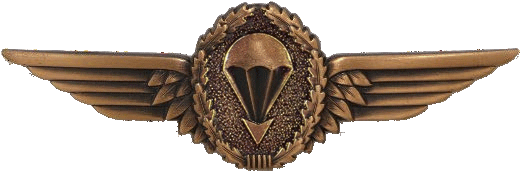
Senior Parachutist Badge
2nd Armored Division Combat Service Identification Badge
Army Staff Identification Badge
United States Cyber Command Badge
National Security Agency Badge
Parachutist Badge (Germany) in bronze

Alexander was inducted into the NPS Hall of Fame in 2013.

== Tax identity theft ==
In the fall of 2014, Alexander told a public forum that someone else had claimed a $9,000 IRS refund in his name, and that the thieves used his identity to apply for about 20 credit cards.

Government offices
Preceded by Michael Hayden	Director of the National Security Agency; 2005–2014	Succeeded by Michael S. Rogers
Military offices
New command	Commander of the United States Cyber Command; 2010–2014	Succeeded by Michael S. Rogers
