= DEF CON Franklin =

Initiative to improve cybersecurity of critical infrastructure in U.S.

DEF CON Franklin is an effort started in 2024 to connect cybersecurity professionals with water utilities across the United States to help them defend against cyberattacks.

== Initiative ==
The name is an homage to Benjamin Franklin who founded the country's first all-volunteer fire department. Water utilities were identified as being particularly vulnerable, with a 2023 report identifying 70% as not meeting basic cybersecurity standards. Threats include nation-state actors like China, Russia and Iran with political objectives such as the ability to disrupt the functioning of hospitals and military bases reliant on rural water systems during a conflict as well as hackers hoping for a ransom payout. Assisting K-12 education institutions was also an early goal in August 2024. Volunteers are from the annual DEF CON conference, University of Chicago Harris School of Public Policy and Craig Newmark Foundation.

Jeff Moss and Jake Braun are co-founders. The initiative started with volunteers but started expanding into offering a managed security service provider (MSSP) model led by Tarah Wheeler tailored to rural water utilities. The effort has been partnering with the National Rural Water Association that also provides assistance to rural utilities. Other partners include the Cyber Resilience Corps, Aspen Digital, the American Water Works Association, Cyber Solarium 2.0, Red Queen Security, UnDisruptable27 and Dragos. The initiative is housed at the Harris Cyber Policy Initiative at the University of Chicago, where Braun is the director.

== See also ==
- Patch the Planet
- Project Glasswing
