= Black Hat (conference) =

Computer security conference

- Status: Active
- Genre: Security Conference
- Frequency: Annual
- Venue: Varies
- Locations: United States, United Kingdom, Singapore
- Years active: 29
- Inaugurated: July 9, 1997
- Founder: Jeff Moss
- Organiser: Informa Festivals
- Website: blackhat.com

Black Hat is a computer security conference that provides security consulting, training, and briefings to security hackers, corporations, and government agencies around the world. Black Hat brings together a variety of people interested in information security ranging from non-technical individuals, executives, hackers, and security professionals. The conference takes place regularly in Las Vegas, Barcelona, London and Riyadh but has also been hosted in Amsterdam, Tokyo, and Washington, D.C.

== History ==
The first Black Hat was held July 7-10, 1997 in Las Vegas, immediately prior to DEF CON 5. The conference was aimed at the computer industry, promising to give them privileged insight into the minds and motivations of their hacker adversaries. Its organizers stated: "While many conferences focus on information and network security, only the Black Hat Briefings will put your engineers and software programmers face-to-face with today's cutting edge computer security experts and 'hackers'." It was presented by DEF CON Communications and Cambridge Technology Partners. It was founded by Jeff Moss, who also founded DEF CON, and is currently the Conference Chair of the Black Hat Review Board. Black Hat started as a single annual conference in Las Vegas, Nevada, and is now held in multiple locations around the world.

At Black Hat USA in 2005, Cisco Systems tried to stop Michael Lynn from speaking about a vulnerability that he said could let hackers virtually shut down the Internet.

In 2009, web sites belonging to a handful of security researchers and groups were hacked and passwords, private e-mails, instant messaging chats, and sensitive documents were exposed on the vandalized site of Dan Kaminsky, days before the conference. In 2008, three men were expelled for packet sniffing the press room local area network. During Black Hat USA in 2009, a USB thumb drive that was passed around among attendees was found to be infected with the Conficker virus.

Conference attendees had been known to hijack wireless connections of the hotels, hack hotel television billing systems, and in one instance, deploy a fake automated teller machine in a hotel lobby.

Black Hat Briefings was acquired by CMP Media, a subsidiary of U.K.-based United Business Media (UBM) in 2005 which was then acquired by Informa Tech in June 2018. After a corporate reorganization in 2025, Black Hat Briefings was moved to the Informa Festivals division.

== Conference components ==
The conference is composed of three major sections which include briefings, trainings, and arsenal.

=== Briefings ===
The Briefings are composed of tracks, covering various topics including reverse engineering, identity and privacy, and hacking. The briefings also contain keynote speeches from leading voices in the information security field, including Robert Lentz, Chief Security Officer, United States Department of Defense; Michael Lynn; Amit Yoran, former Director of the National Cyber Security Division of the Department of Homeland Security; and General Keith B. Alexander, former Director of the National Security Agency and former commander of the United States Cyber Command.

=== Trainings ===
Training is offered by various computer security vendors and individual security professionals. The conference has hosted the National Security Agency's information assurance manager course, and various courses by Cisco Systems, Offensive Security, and others.

=== Arsenal ===
Arsenal is a portion of the conference dedicated to giving researchers and the open source community a place to showcase their latest open-source information security tools. Arsenal primarily consists of live tool demonstrations in a setting where attendees can ask questions about the tools and sometimes use them. It was added in 2010. ToolsWatch maintains an archive of all Black Hat Briefings Arsenals.

== List of events ==
Black Hat had initially started within the United States but expanded over the years across USA, Europe, Asia, Middle East, Africa, Washington DC, and Abu Dhabi:

Event	Dates	Location	Venue
Black Hat Asia 2026	April 21 - April 24	Singapore	Marina Bay Sands
Black Hat Asia 2025	April 1 - April 4	Singapore	Marina Bay Sands
Black Hat Asia 2024	April 16 - April 19	Singapore	Marina Bay Sands
Black Hat Spring Trainings 2024	March 12 - March 15	United States, Washington DC	Walter E Washington Convention Center
Black Hat Europe 2023	December 4 - December 7	United Kingdom, London	Excel London
Black Hat USA 2023	August 5 - August 10	United States, Las Vegas, Virtual	Mandalay Bay
Black Hat Asia 2023	May 9 - May 12	Singapore, Virtual	Marina Bay Sands
Black Hat Spring Trainings 2023	March 13 - March 16	Virtual	N/A
Black Hat Europe 2022	December 5 - December 8	United Kingdom, London	Excel London
Black Hat USA 2022	August 6 - August 11	United States, Las Vegas, Virtual	Mandalay Bay
Black Hat Spring Trainings 2022	June 13 - June 16	Virtual	N/A
Black Hat Asia 2022	May 10 - May 13	Singapore, Virtual	Marina Bay Sands
Black Hat Europe 2021	November 8 - November 11	United Kingdom, London	Excel London
Black Hat USA 2021	July 31 - August 5	United States, Las Vegas, Virtual	Mandalay Bay
Black Hat Asia 2021	May 4 - May 7	Virtual	N/A
Black Hat Spring Trainings 2021	March 15 - March 18	Virtual	N/A
Black Hat Europe 2020	December 7 - December 10	Virtual	N/A
Black Hat Asia 2020	September 29 - October 2	Virtual	N/A
Black Hat USA 2020	August 1 - August 6	Virtual	N/A
Black Hat Europe 2019	December 2 - December 5	United Kingdom, London	Excel London
Black Hat Trainings 2019	October 17 - October 18	United States, Alexandria	Hilton Alexandria
Black Hat USA 2019	August 3 - August 8	United States, Las Vegas	Mandalay Bay
Black Hat Asia 2019	March 26 - March 29	Singapore	Marina Bay Sands
Black Hat Europe 2018	December 3 - December 6	United Kingdom, London	Excel London
Black Hat Trainings 2018	October 22 - October 23	United States, Chicago	Sheraton Grand Chicago
Black Hat USA 2018	August 4 - August 9	United States, Las Vegas	Mandalay Bay
Black Hat Asia 2018	March 20 - March 23	Singapore	Marina Bay Sands
Black Hat Europe 2017	December 4 - December 7	United Kingdom, London	Excel London
Black Hat USA 2017	July 22 - July 27	United States, Las Vegas	Mandalay Bay
Black Hat Asia 2017	March 28 - March 31	Singapore	Marina Bay Sands
Black Hat Europe 2016	November 1 - November 4	United Kingdom, London	Business Design Centre
Black Hat USA 2016	July 30 - August 4	United States, Las Vegas	Mandalay Bay
Black Hat Asia 2016	March 29 - April 1	Singapore	Marina Bay Sands
Black Hat Europe 2015	November 10 - November 13	Netherlands, Amsterdam	Amsterdam RAI
Black Hat USA 2015	August 1 - August 6	United States, Las Vegas	Mandalay Bay
Black Hat Asia 2015	March 24 - March 27	Singapore	Marina Bay Sands
Black Hat Trainings 2014	December 8 - December 11	United States, Potomac	The Bolger Center
Black Hat Europe 2014	October 14 - October 17	Netherlands, Amsterdam	Amsterdam RAI
Black Hat USA 2014	August 2 - August 7	United States, Las Vegas	Mandalay Bay
Black Hat Asia 2014	March 25 - March 28	Singapore	Marina Bay Sands
Black Hat USA 2013	July 27 - August 1	United States, Las Vegas	Caesars Palace
Black Hat Europe 2013	March 12 - March 15	Netherlands, Amsterdam	Grand Hotel Krasnapolsky
Black Hat USA 2012	July 21 - July 26	United States, Las Vegas	Caesars Palace
Black Hat Europe 2012	March 14 - March 16	Netherlands, Amsterdam	Grand Hotel Krasnapolsky
Black Hat USA 2011	July 30 - August 4	United States, Las Vegas	Caesars Palace
Black Hat DC 2011	January 16 - January 19	United States, Crystal City	Hyatt Regency
Black Hat USA 2010	July 24 - July 29	United States, Las Vegas	Caesars Palace
Black Hat DC 2010	January 31 - February 3	United States, Crystal City	Hyatt Regency
Black Hat USA 2009	July 25 - July 30	United States, Las Vegas	Caesars Palace
Black Hat DC 2009	February 16 - February 17	United States, Crystal City	Hyatt Regency
Black Hat USA 2008	August 2 - August 7	United States, Las Vegas	Caesars Palace
Black Hat DC 2008	February 18 - February 21	United States, Crystal City	Westin Washington DC City Center
Black Hat USA 2007	July 28 - August 2	United States, Las Vegas	Caesars Palace
Black Hat USA 2006	July 29 - August 3	United States, Las Vegas	Caesars Palace
Black Hat Federal 2006	January 23 - January 26	United States, Crystal City	Sheraton Crystal City
Black Hat USA 2005	July 23 - July 28	United States, Las Vegas	Caesars Palace
Black Hat USA 2004	July 24 - July 29	United States, Las Vegas	Caesars Palace
Black Hat Federal 2003	September 29 - October 2	United States, Tysons Corner, Virginia	Sheraton Premiere
Black Hat USA 2003	July 28 - July 31	United States, Las Vegas	Caesars Palace
Black Hat USA 2002	July 29 - August 1	United States, Las Vegas	Caesars Palace
The Black Hat Briefings '01	July 11 - July 12 2001	United States, Las Vegas	Caesars Palace
The Black Hat Briefings '00	July 26 - July 27 2000	United States, Las Vegas	Caesars Palace
The Black Hat Briefings '99	July 7 - July 8 1999	United States, Las Vegas	The Venetian
The Black Hat Briefings '98	July 29 - July 30 1998	United States, Las Vegas	Caesars Palace
The Black Hat Briefings '97	July 9 - July 10 1997	United States, Las Vegas	Aladdin Hotel and Casino

== See also ==
- DEF CON
- Hacker conference
- Chaos Communication Congress
- Summercon
- Positive Hack Days
