= Jake Braun =

American political, cyber and national security expert

Jacob H. Braun
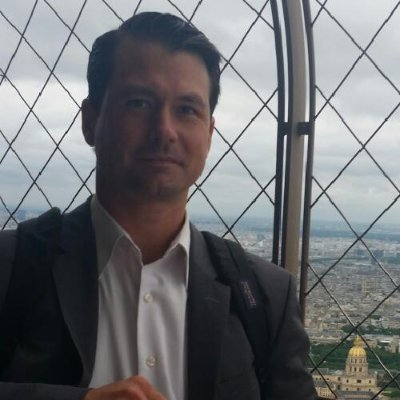
- Education: Loyola University of Chicago, Troy University, National Louis University
- Occupations: University Lecturer & Cyber Security Expert

Jacob H. Braun (born October 3, 1975) is an American cyber and national security expert. He was appointed by President Joseph Biden as the U.S. Department of Homeland Security (DHS) Secretary's Senior Advisor to the Management Directorate, and as Senior Counselor for Transformation to the Secretary of Homeland Security from June 2021 - May 2023. He was later appointed as the Acting Principal Deputy National Cyber Director in The White House from May 2023 - July 2024.

He is the CEO of Cambridge Global Advisors (CGA), a bipartisan consulting firm based in Washington, DC. Braun is also a senior lecturer at the University of Chicago’s Harris School of Public Policy Studies where he teaches courses on cyber policy and election security and also serves as the Executive Director for the University of Chicago Harris Cyber Policy Initiative (CPI).

From 2009 to 2011, Braun served as White House Liaison to the U.S. Department of Homeland Security. He has also served as National Deputy Field Director for Obama for America in 2008 and as the Michigan Field Director for John Kerry in 2004.

Braun is co-founder of the DEF CON Voting Machine Hacking Village (Voting Village) hacker conference.

== Education ==
Braun is a graduate of Troy St. University where he earned an MA in International Relations. He also has a Master’s in Secondary Education from National Louis University in Chicago and a BA in Philosophy from Loyola University of Chicago.

== Career ==
Braun began his career as a journalist reporting for newspapers in Illinois and Taiwan. Braun has worked on political campaigns for Democratic and progressive candidates. He has headed initiatives for the Democratic National Committee (DNC), Democratic Congressional Campaign Committee (DCCC) and multiple state Democratic Party committees.

Braun served on the Presidential Transition Team in 2008-2009 for the Obama Administration as Deputy Director for the National Security Agencies Review, which oversaw the agency review process for the State Department, DOD, DHS, CIA, USAID. He was appointed White House Liaison to the U.S. Department of Homeland Security on January 21, 2009, where he facilitated key DHS public engagements.

Braun focused on cybersecurity issues. He serves in the President’s Circle on the Chicago Council on Global Affairs and as a strategic advisor to the Department of Homeland Security and the Pentagon on cybersecurity.

In 2017, following intelligence reports highlighting Russian hacking attempts and interference in the 2016 presidential election, Braun co-founded DEF CON’s Voting Village as an effort to illuminate vulnerabilities in domestic election security. The event was renewed in 2018 and 2019 and featured additional components of U.S. election infrastructure including the hacking of mock Secretary of State websites. In cooperation with DEF CON, Braun has co-authored two works on election infrastructure cyber vulnerabilities, The DEF CON 25 and 26 Voting Village Reports.

On February 13, 2018, in a hearing titled “Defending Our Democracy: Building Partnerships to Protect America’s Elections,” Braun testified before the U.S. House Homeland Committee on his election security work with CPI and DEF CON.

In February 2021, Braun was appointed as a Senior Advisor to the DHS Management Directorate. His initial focus will be on managing and recruiting cybersecurity professionals.

In 2024, Braun co-founded an organization dedicated to improving cybersecurity of critical U.S. infrastructure like water supplies called DEF CON Franklin.

== Publications ==
Braun is the author of a book on the subject of election security entitled Democracy in Danger: How Hackers and Activists Exposed Fatal Flaws in the Election System published by Rowman & Littlefield in 2019, as well as a June 2020 article in the Boston Review entitled "A Perfect Storm of Vulnerabilities Could Determine the 2020 Election."

== Awards ==
Along with the team that wrote the DEF CON Voting Village report, Braun was Gold winner for the Cybersecurity Project of the Year and finalist for the award for Cybersecurity Team of the Year. In 2023, Braun was recognized by the Department of Homeland Security for the Secretary’s Meritorious Service Silver Medal Award.
