= Defcon Robot Contest =

Former robotics contest held at Defcon

The Defcon Robot Contest was a robotics competition which was held at the annual DEF CON computer security conference in Las Vegas.

== History ==
=== Defcon 12 (2004) ===
The first competition was held at Defcon 11 in 2003. The objective was to transport ping pong balls from one corner of an arena to the other. Only Irvine Underground entered a team and they were able to successfully complete the task.

=== Defcon 13 (2005) ===
The task this year was to first follow a line around a maze, scooping up ping pong balls along the way, then fire them at cans on a wall at one end of the arena. Two teams entered this year, with the team from Florida winning.

=== Defcon 14: (2006) ===
Since the previous contests proved to be too expensive, the Defcon 14 rules were changed to make it easier for the smaller teams to compete. The requirement for battery power was dropped, but the requirement to be fully autonomous was enforced. The goal was to shoot down 1, 2, and 3 inch white targets from 10 feet away. 6 teams entered and all teams were able to shoot down many targets. Team Octopi, a team of four computer science and computer engineering students from The University of Utah won the contest. They shot down 28 targets in 37 seconds.

=== Defcon 15: (2007) ===
This year's task was very similar to Defcon 14, with only minor changes. The main change was that targets were no longer infrared (so no special IR camera was required). Also, to make it more exciting, the format was changed from timed match to head-to-head match (double elimination). The winners were Team Octopi again, shooting 24 targets in 16.6 seconds.

Team Octopi's bot has shown significantly better results than other teams (second place was 35.6 seconds, almost twice as slow), so to encourage more people to compete they have promised not to participate in next year's competition.

=== Defcon 16: (2008) ===
This year's rules were exactly the same as previous years. First place was taken by Team Yozhik, shooting 24 targets in 15.7 seconds. This was the first time that team participated in DefconBots competition. Before that, the team took first place in RoboGames 2008 competition in San Francisco.

The contest's organizer, Kallahar, has stated that next year's competition will be in a different format. One reason for that was the high complexity of building a shooting robot—winning teams used expensive parts like industrial AC servo motors, commercial AC/micro-stepping controllers and high precision Harmonic drive gearboxes. While the teams did not pay the full price for them (because of eBay or corporate donations), other teams would have to spend large amounts of money to replicate the winning designs.

== Prizes ==
Each year the prizes change, but the real prize is the respect earned. The prizes do not even come close to covering the cost of building the bot.

Since Defcon 14, the prize includes Black Badge, which gives lifetime unlimited entry to all future Defcons.

=== External links ===
- Official Contest Page
- Winners of the Defcon 13 robot contest
- Winners of the Defcon 14 robot contest
- Winners of the Defcon 15 robot contest
- Winners of the Defcon 16 robot contest
