= Alexis Park =

Alexis Park All Suite Resort

General information
- Type: Hotel
- Location: 375 East Harmon Avenue, Paradise, Nevada, United States
- Coordinates: 36.106499°N 115.156113°W
- Opened: July 2, 1984
- Renovated: 2004
- Cost: $40 million
- Renovation cost: $5 million

Technical details
- Grounds: 19 acres

Design and construction
- Developer: Schulman Development Corporation

Other information
- Number of rooms: 500

Website
- www.alexispark.com

The Alexis Park All Suite Resort is a 19-acre low-rise luxury resort hotel located east of the Las Vegas Strip in Paradise, Nevada. It opened on July 2, 1984, as a non-gaming alternative to the city's hotel/casino resorts.

== History ==
=== Early years ===
Alexis Park was developed by Robert H. Schulman and his Los Angeles–based company, Schulman Development Corporation. Schulman purchased the vacant property from the Howard Hughes Trust in November 1983, at a cost of $3.6 million. The project cost an ultimate total of $40 million, financed by American Diversified Capital Corporation. Schulman's firm conducted market research which found that a significant portion of the public preferred an alternative to high-rise hotels. Schulman concluded that a low-rise luxury resort with a country club environment would have wide appeal to Las Vegas tourists.

Alexis Park's lack of gambling was unique for a Las Vegas hotel of its size. An earlier Las Vegas hotel resort, the Tallyho, had opened without a casino during the 1960s, but was unsuccessful. However, Schulman believed that Alexis Park could succeed without a casino, saying that Las Vegas was "long overdue for a luxurious, non-gaming hotel." Schulman disliked hotels with casinos, finding them to be noisy and distracting. However, he did not rule out adding a casino at a later date. Concrete pouring for the resort was underway in January 1984. The goal was to have the hotel opened by mid-1984, in time for the busy summer convention season. It would also capitalize on people travelling to or from Los Angeles, where the 1984 Summer Olympics would be held. Approximately 5,000 people applied for jobs at the resort, and 400 were chosen to fill the positions.

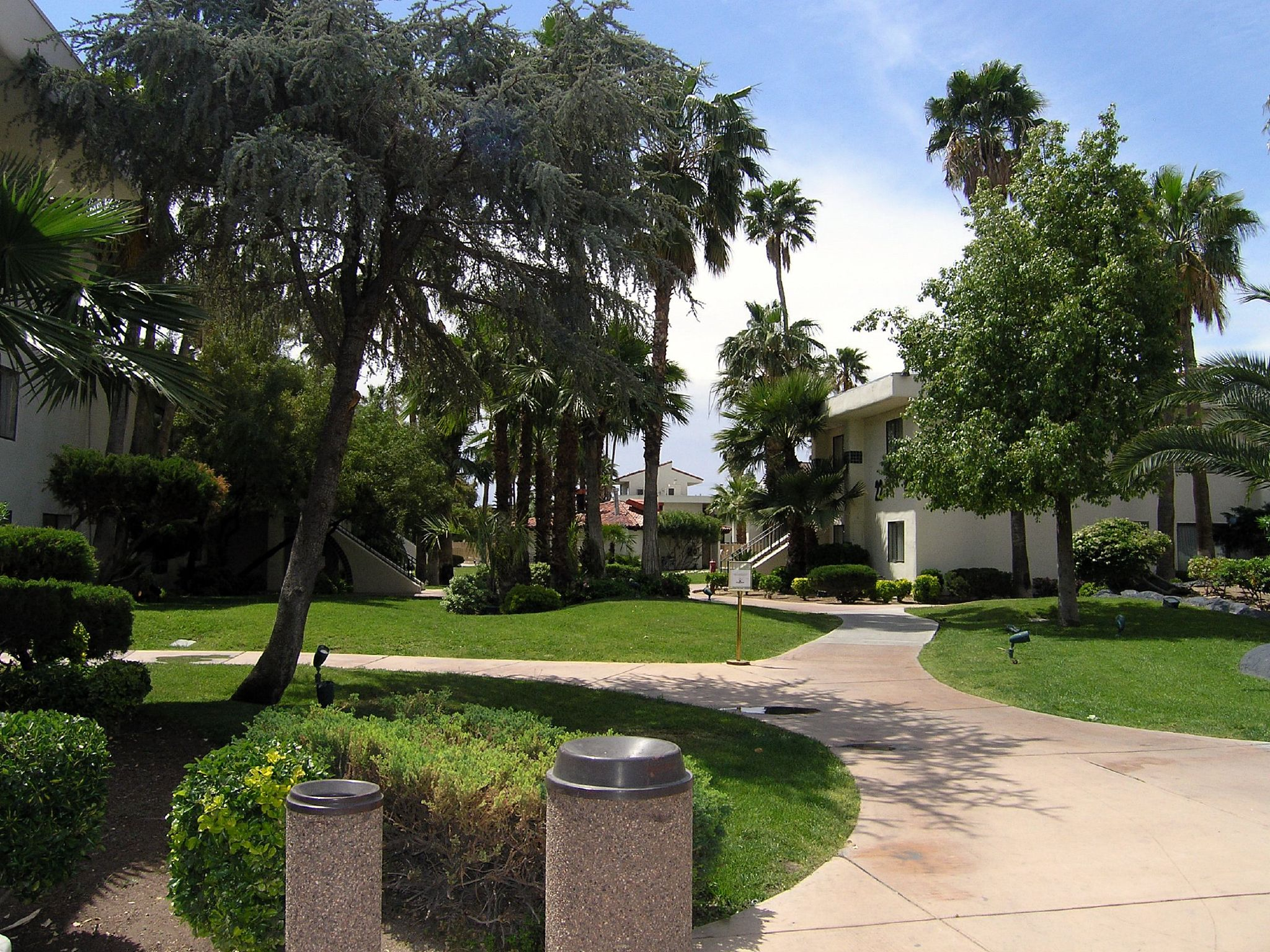
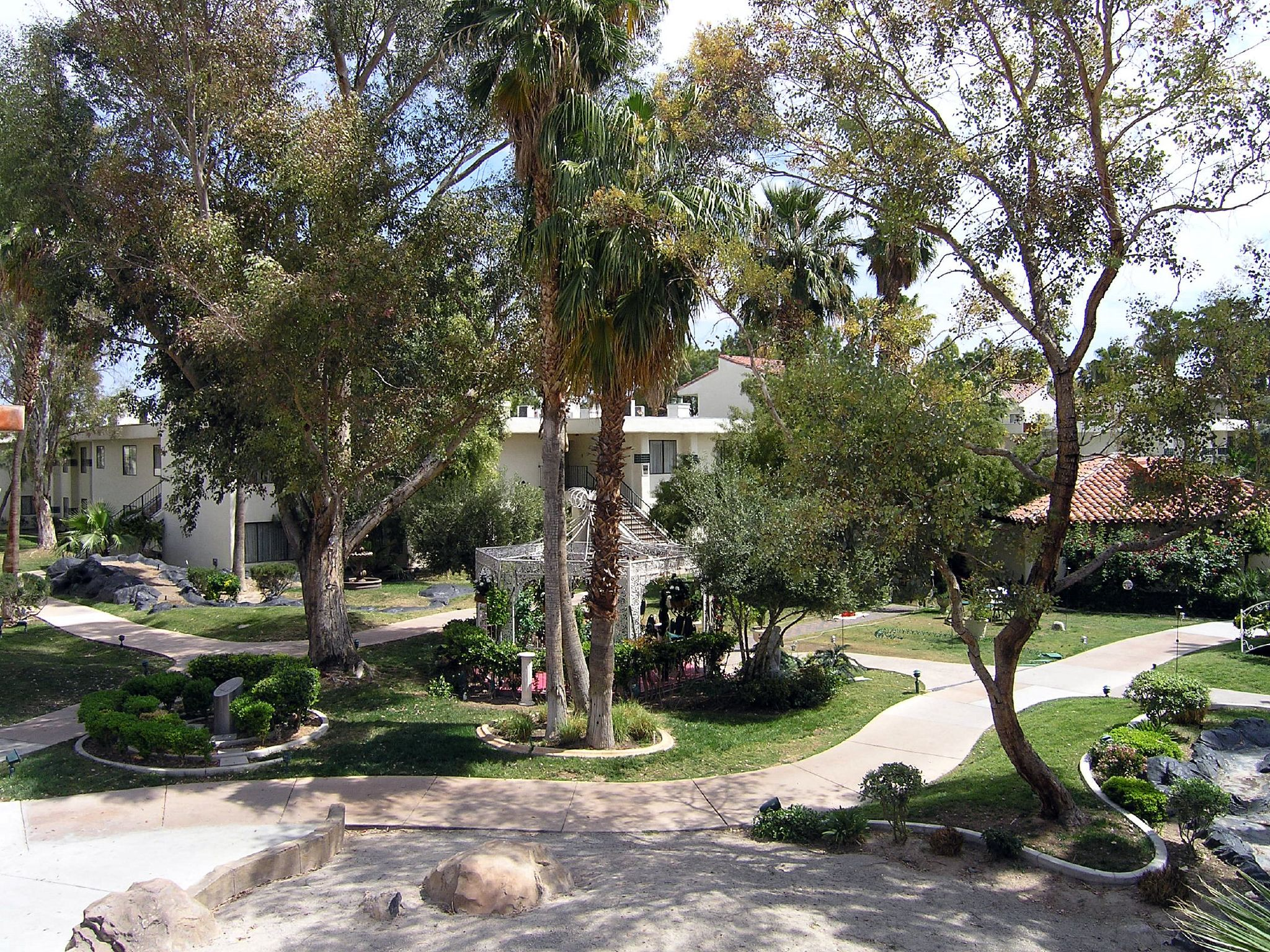
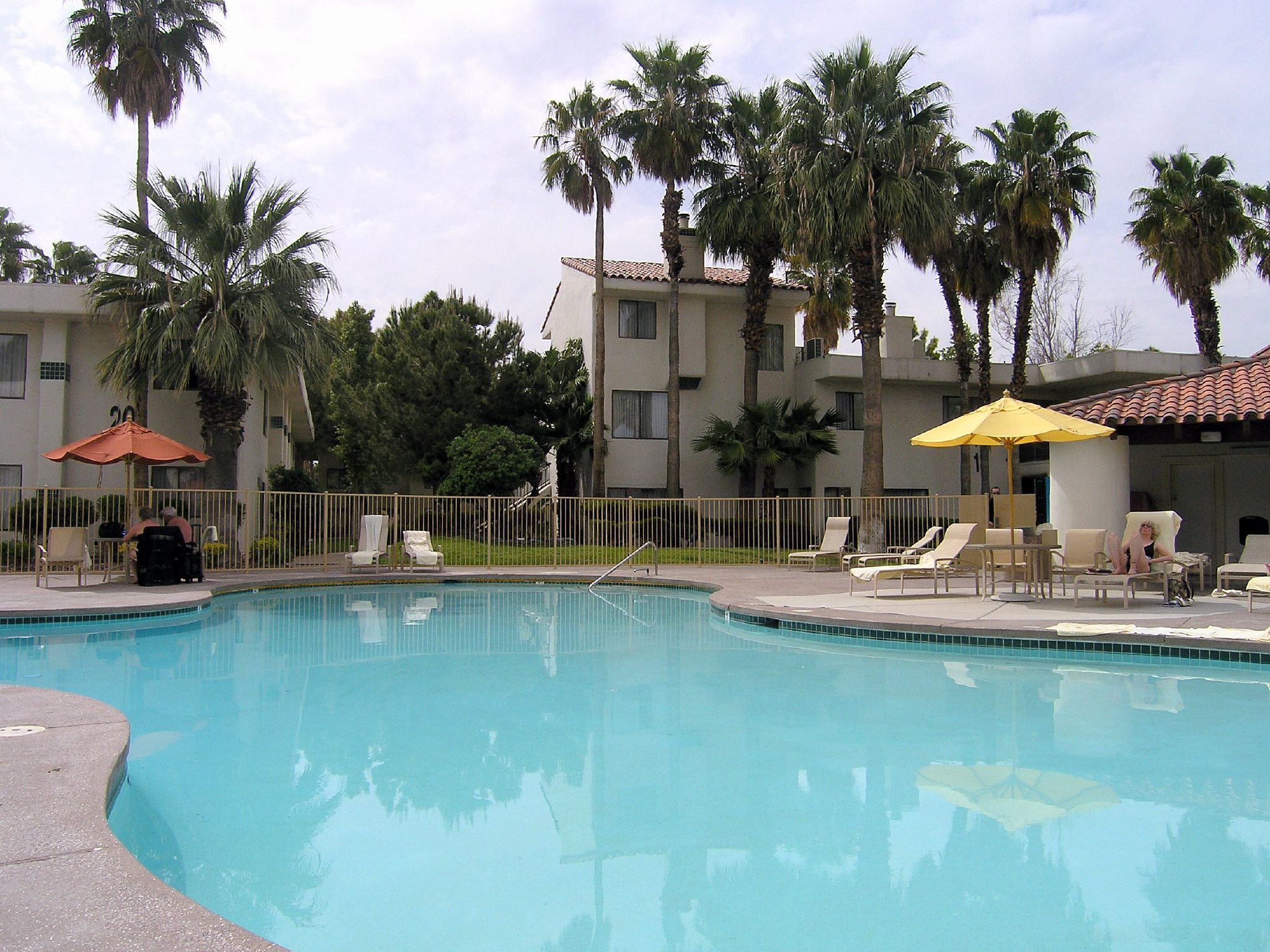
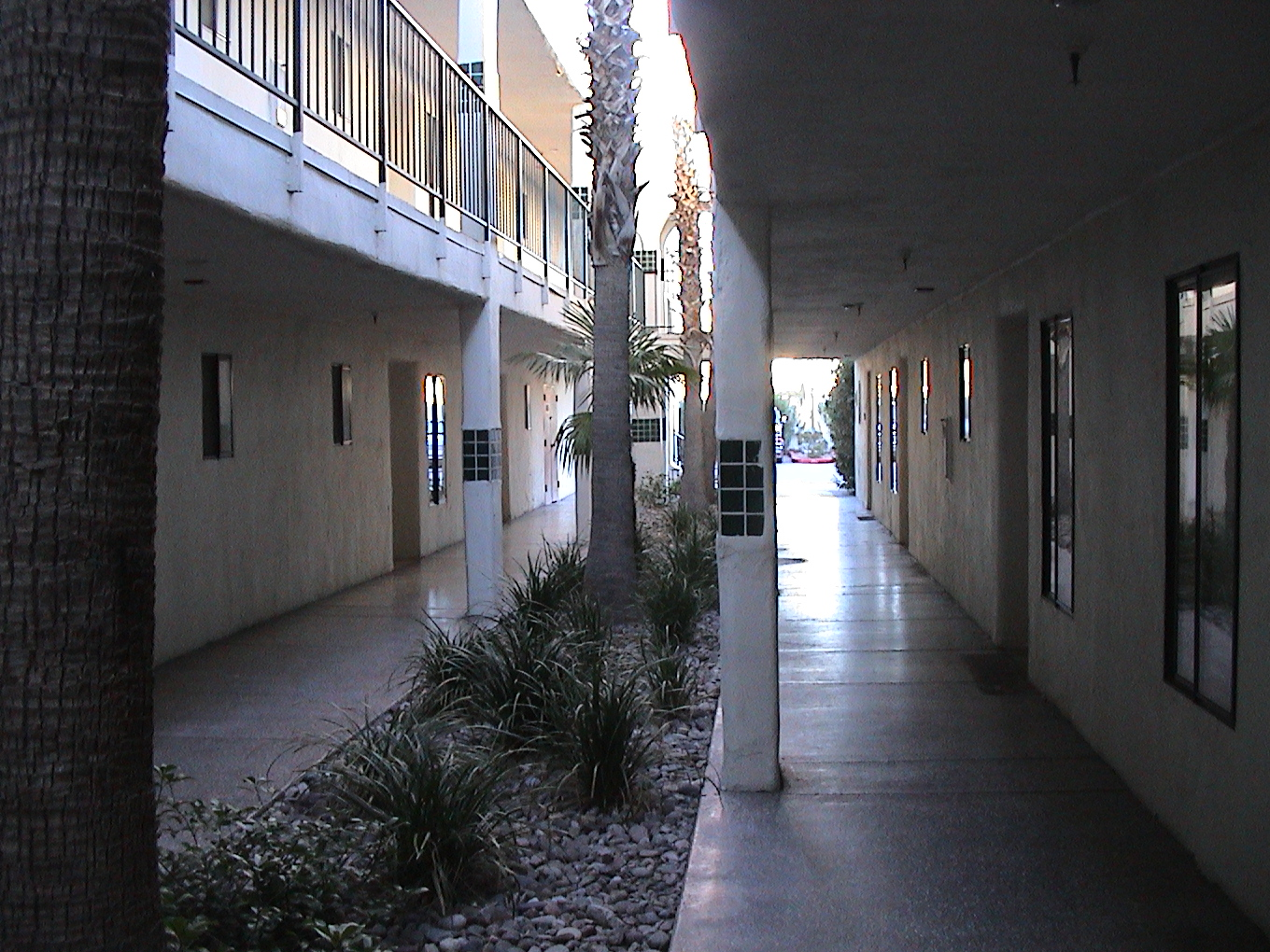
Various areas of the hotel

Alexis Park opened on July 2, 1984, with 500 rooms, all of them suites and located in a series of white-colored motel buildings. Most of the buildings were two stories, although some featured lofts. The 19-acre Alexis Park featured a Mediterranean theme with a country club setting, including greenery and palm trees, waterfalls and streams, and fake boulders. The hotel included a nine-hole putting green and two restaurants. Other amenities included three pools, a fitness center, a spa, tennis courts, and office facilities. Schulman considered the resort a retreat for business executives. Alexis Park was built just east of the Las Vegas Strip, and the resort offered free bus shuttle service to the Strip. The McCarran International Airport was also located nearby.

The hotel was successful after its opening, in part because overcrowded Las Vegas Strip resorts would send guests there. Alexis Park also became particularly popular with local residents who would make advanced reservations to stay at the hotel on weekends. Southwest Airlines later contracted with Alexis Park to have crew members stay at the hotel as well. The resort's eateries, including the Pegasus Room restaurant, were popular for their food. In 1985, an expanded convention and meeting facility was being planned. The hotel rooms and food were among the best in Las Vegas according to Zagat in 1992. In 1997, Alexis Park sued an excavation company after it allegedly severed the resort's main telephone line.

By the late 1990s, the resort was owned by Louis Habash. In 1998, Alexis Park made an offer to purchase the adjacent 208-unit Americana Inn apartment complex, located west of the resort, with plans to convert it into a hotel building that would connect to Alexis Park. The resort also planned to construct a three-story, 120-unit hotel building. In addition, there were plans to convert the hotel lobby into a 7,079 sq ft (657.7 m^{2}) casino after the purchase of the Americana Inn. These plans did not materialize.

In 1998, the National Lesbian and Gay Journalists Association held its first Las Vegas convention at Alexis Park. No other major resorts were interested in hosting the event, and Alexis Park subsequently hosted other gay events, developing a reputation as a gay friendly property. From 1999 through 2005, Alexis Park hosted the DEF CON convention. As of 2004, Alexis Park had 57,000 sq ft (5,300 m^{2}) of meeting space, and the hotel had been used as a venue by the Consumer Electronics Show to demonstrate music systems. Two interactive dinner shows, Joey and Maria's Comedy Italian Wedding and The Reunion, opened at the resort's 150-seat ballroom in September 2003.

In 1999, the resort sued Clark County, Nevada, alleging that a new north–south runway at McCarran International Airport had resulted in noise disturbances for its guests. The lawsuit also stated that the resort's air space easement had been reduced from 90 feet to 39 feet, preventing any possible construction of additional floors. The county sought to dismiss the lawsuit, but a judge declined the request. In 2003, Alexis Park agreed to put its case on hold until an appeal could be heard on a related case involving a nearby property owner.

=== Sale and renovations ===
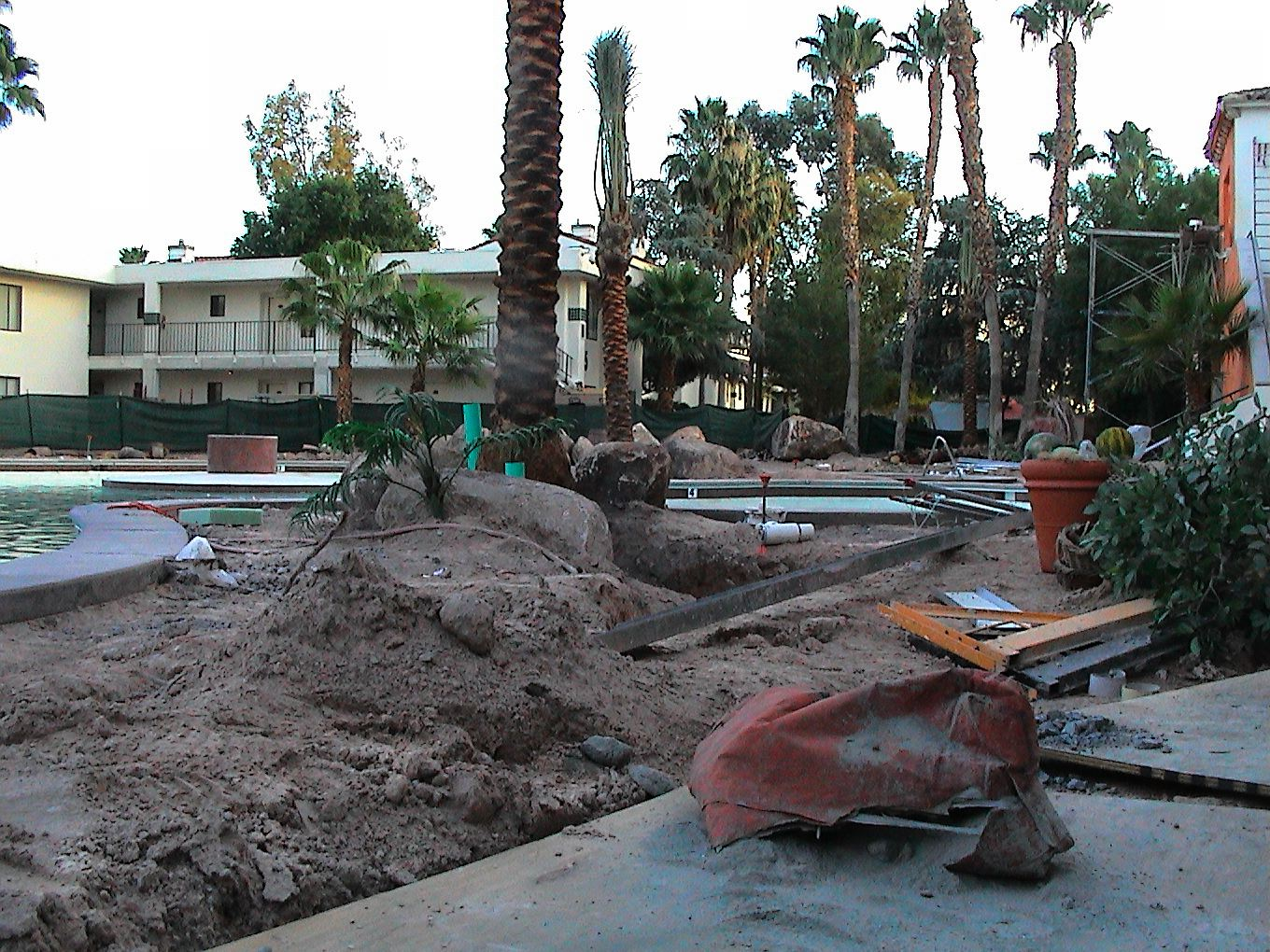
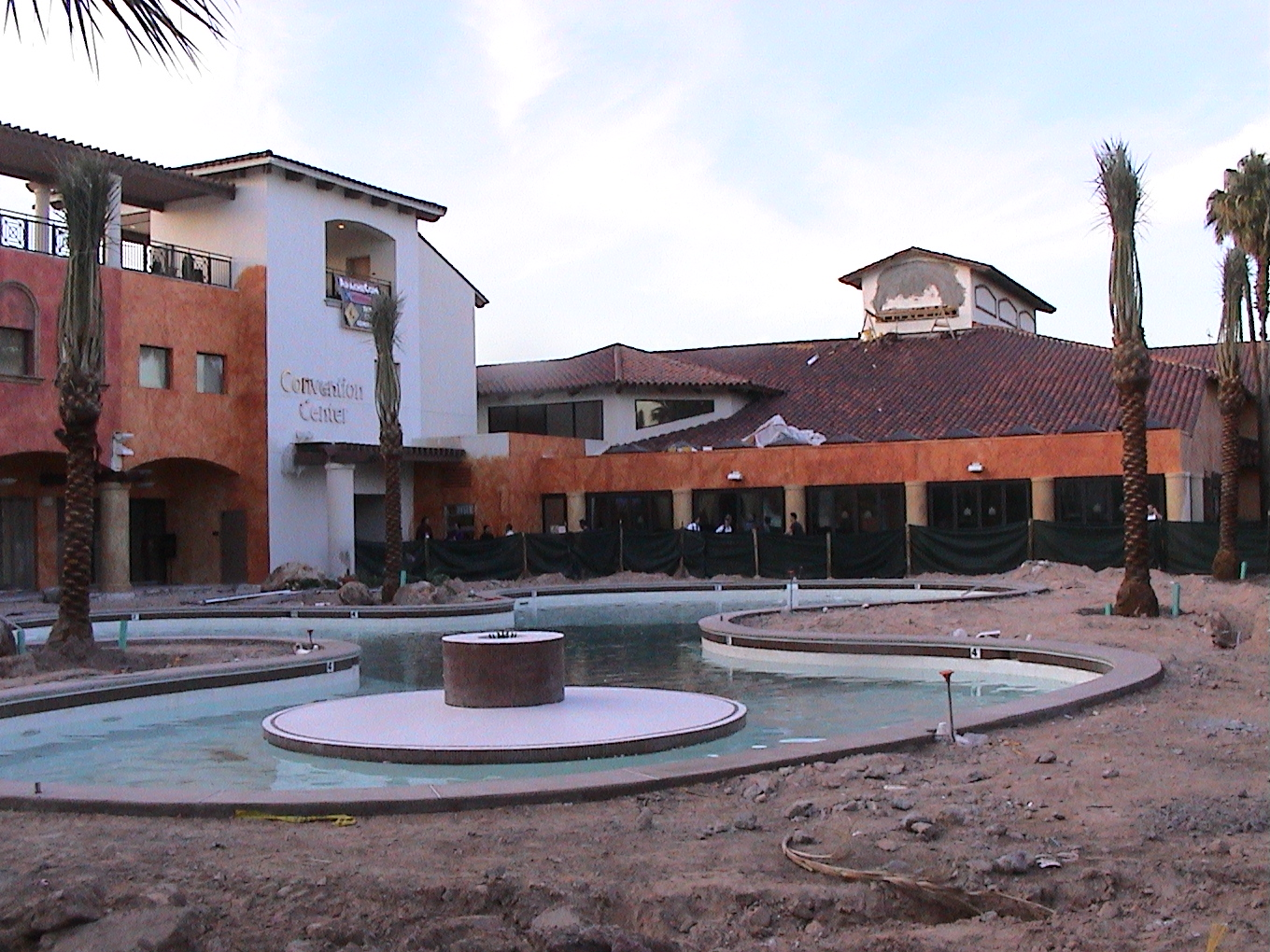
Renovations during November 2004

In the early 2000s, Richard Alter, of the Los Angeles–based Financial Capital Investment Company, was interested in buying a Las Vegas resort. His company owned several hotel properties, but none in Las Vegas. Alter had previously made attempts to purchase the Aladdin, Las Vegas Hilton, and the Regent. In January 2004, Alter met with Habash to try persuading him to sell the hotel. Habash was reluctant to sell but ultimately agreed to do so in March 2004. The purchase was finalized two months later. Alter said that Habash had many plans for the property but never proceeded with them due to a lack of financing.

Alter purchased Alexis Park and the Americana Inn apartments at a cost of $70 million. The Alexis Park property accounted for $62 million of the purchase price. Alter, through his company, planned a $210 million project that would include converting the hotel units into luxury villas. The project would also include the demolition of the apartments, to be replaced with a casino, timeshare, and 15-story condo hotel. The entire property would be renamed, and the project would take at least three years to complete.

During 2004, Alter made various improvements at the resort, including a new $500,000 glass wall entrance, a new lobby, and new hotel furniture. Cabanas and lanai rooms were built for the pool area. The resort remained open during the renovation project. A $750,000 club and lounge, 375 Supper Club, opened in November 2004. It was named after the property's street address number on Harmon Avenue, and it replaced the Pegasus Room restaurant. At the time, the hotel building exteriors were being repainted with a new color scheme of orange and red. Alter had disliked the hotel's previous white-colored appearance, saying, "It used to be ugly. It looked like a hospital." There were also plans to add a new, digital sign along Harmon Avenue.

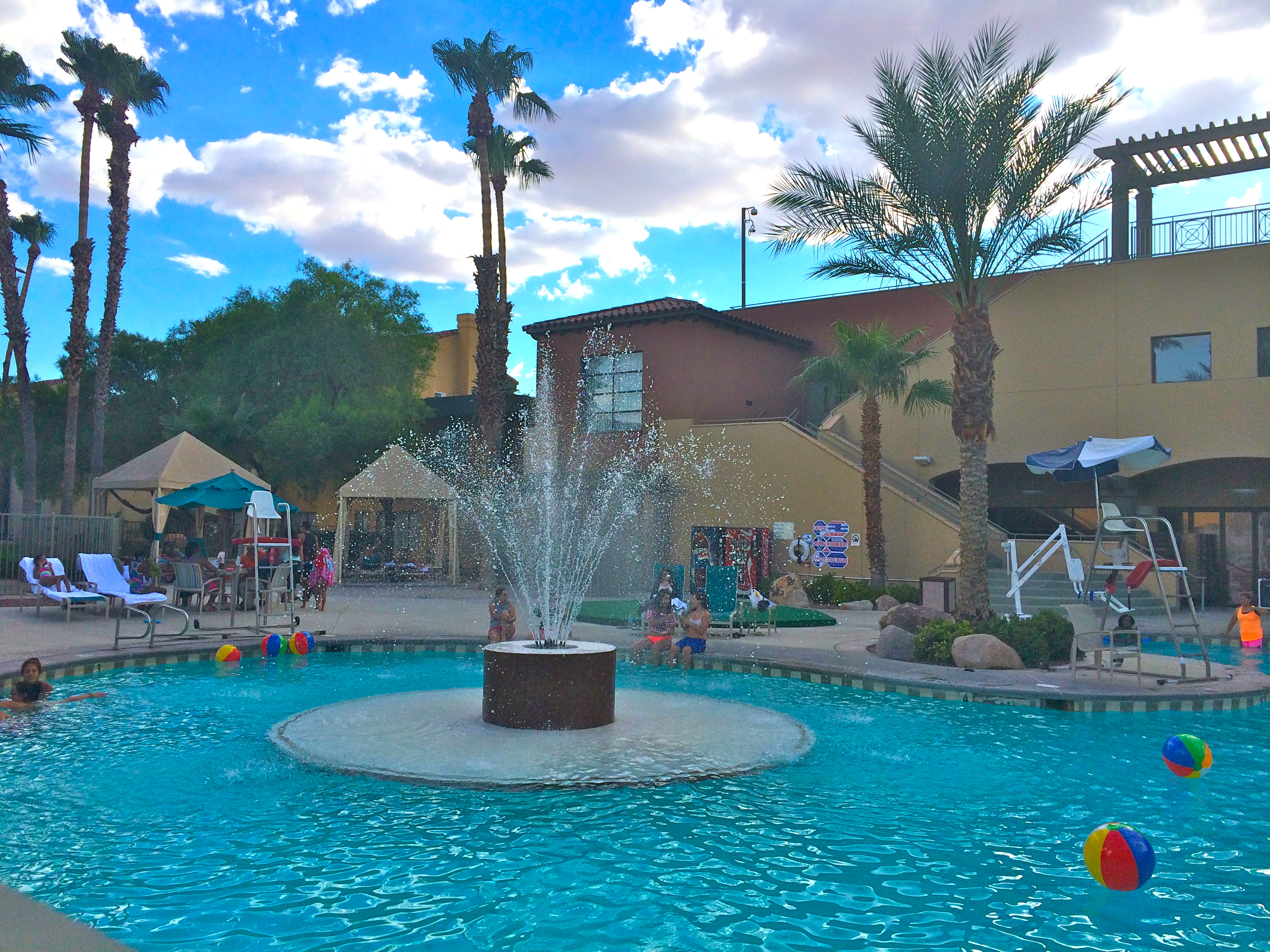
Pool area in 2014

At the end of 2004, Alter acquired a former mobile home park on 4.7 acres located behind the Americana, at a cost of $10 million. In total, Alter had 28 acres of property, and was planning a casino and a 28-story hotel with 1,000 rooms. The tower would not be affected by height restrictions related to aviation. The project was designed by Joel Bergman, and would also include a 1,500-space parking garage, to be built on the site of the former mobile home park. The 2004 renovations cost $5 million, and were the first phase in Alter's eventual plans for the property. Alter's planned resort project was expected to be completed by April 2007. Until then, he intended to install 15 slot machines in the 375 Supper Club in 2005. Alter's redevelopment plans never broke ground.

In 2007, the resort opened Spin Nightclub in what was previously the Pegasus lobby bar. It was the fourth club to open in the space, and it had capacity for up to 1,000 people. Spin Nightclub soon outgrew the space at Alexis Park and was relocated elsewhere. As of 2020, the resort has two restaurants: Alexis Gardens, and Pegasus Bar & Grill.
