= Combined Information Data Network Exchange =

Combined Information Data Network Exchange, or CIDNE, is a computer system used by the US military. It is used to collect tactical information from troops.

In 2010 US Army Private Chelsea Manning (then known as Bradley) was accused by the US government of giving out information from CIDNEI and CIDNEA (CIDNE Iraq and CIDNE Afghanistan) to people not entitled to receive it, in violation of various US laws (and, by inclusion, portions of the Uniform Code of Military Justice). Numerous media have reported that these are the documents contained in WikiLeaks' publication of Afghan War documents and Iraq war documents.

== See also ==
- Real Time Regional Gateway
- United States v. Manning
- SIPRNet
