= Jeff Moss (hacker) =

American computer security expert (born 1975)

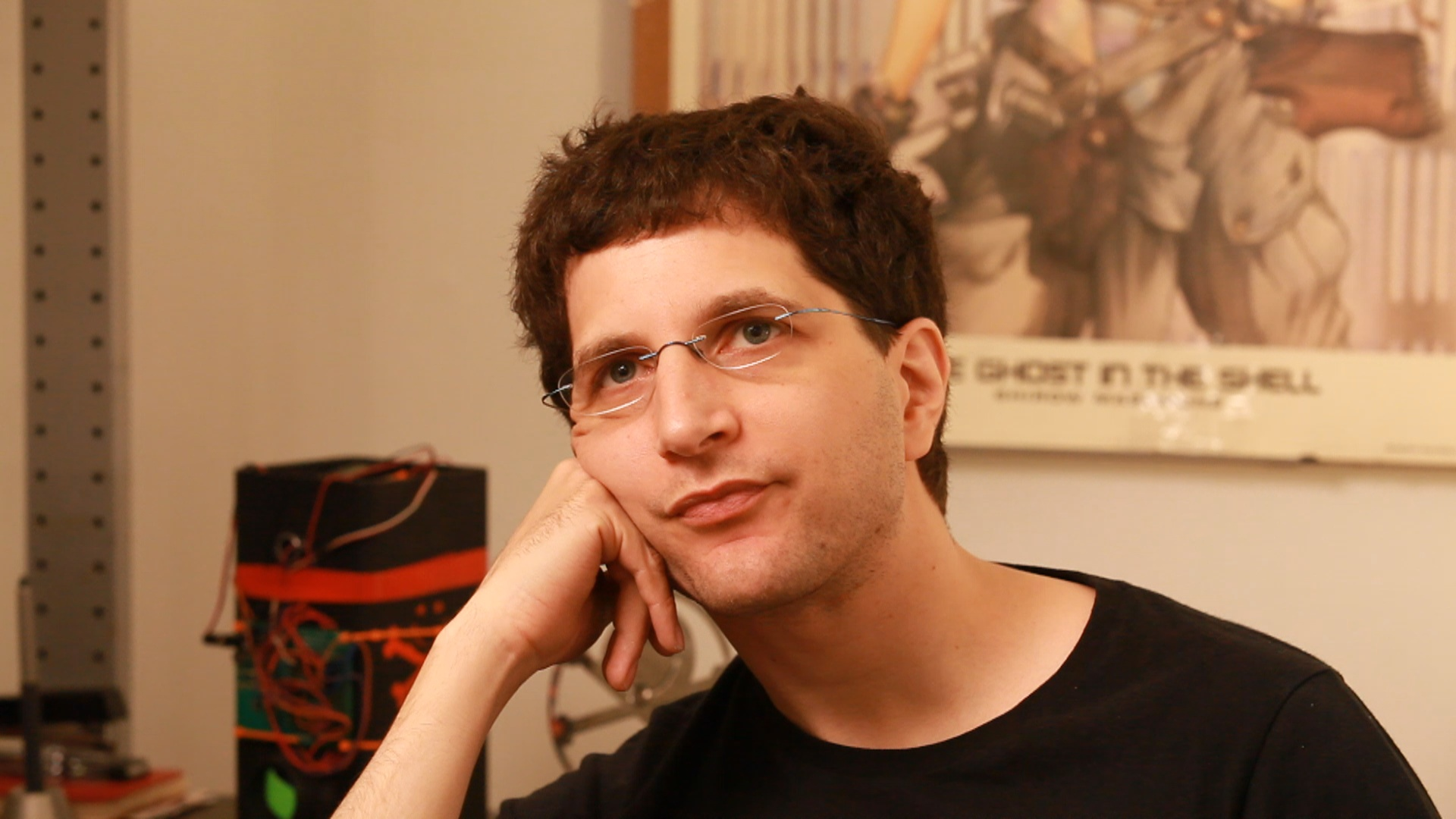
- Moss in 2012
- Born: Jeff Moss; January 1, 1975 (age 51); California, U.S.
- Education: Gonzaga University, Criminal Justice (BA 1990)
- Occupations: computer security, internet security expert
- Known for: Founder of the Black Hat and DEF CON computer hacker conferences
- Website: www.defcon.org

Jeff Moss (born January 1, 1975), also known as Dark Tangent, is an American hacker, computer and internet security expert who founded the Black Hat and DEF CON computer security conferences.

== Early life and education ==
Moss received his first computer at the age of 10. He became fascinated because he wasn't old enough to drive a car or vote, but he could engage in adult conversation with people all over the country.

Moss graduated from Gonzaga University with a BA in Criminal Justice. He worked for Ernst & Young, LLP in their Information System Security division and was a director at Secure Computing Corporation where he helped establish the Professional Services Department in the United States, Asia, and Australia.

== Security conferences ==
In 1993 he created the first DEF CON hacker convention, based around a party for members of a Fido hacking network in Canada. It slowly grew, and by 1999 was attracting major attention.

In 1997 he created Black Hat Briefings computer security conference that brings together a variety of people interested in information security. He sold Black Hat in 2005 to CMP Media, a subsidiary of UK-based United Business Media, for a reported US$13.9 million. DEF CON was not included in the sale.

In 2018 Jeff launched the first DEF CON hacker convention outside of the United States. Holding the same name DEF CON China was hosted in Beijing, China and co-hosted by Baidu. The first year of DEF CON China was labeled a [Beta] year, and in 2019 they formalized the conference with DEF CON China 1.0.

== Later career ==
Moss is a member and regular attendee of the Washington D.C. based Council on Foreign Relations (CFR), an independent, nonpartisan membership organization, think tank, and publisher.

In 2009 Moss was sworn into the Homeland Security Advisory Council of the Barack Obama administration.

On April 28, 2011, Jeff Moss was appointed ICANN Chief Security Officer.

In July 2012, Secretary Janet Napolitano directed the Homeland Security Advisory Council to form the Task Force on CyberSkills in response to the increasing demand for the best and brightest in the cybersecurity field across industry, academia and government. The Task Force, co-chaired by Jeff Moss and Alan Paller, conducted extensive interviews with experts from government, the private sector, and academia in developing its recommendations to grow the advanced technical skills of the DHS cybersecurity workforce and expand the national pipeline of men and women with these cybersecurity skills. On October 1, the HSAC unanimously approved sending the Task Force recommendations to the Secretary.

In October 2013, Jeff announced that he would be stepping down from his position at ICANN at the end of 2013.

In 2013, Jeff was appointed as a Nonresident Senior Fellow at the Atlantic Council, associated with the Cyber Statecraft Initiative, within the Brent Scowcroft Center on International Security.

In 2014, Jeff joined the Georgetown University School of Law School Cybersecurity Advisory Committee.

18 March 2016, Richemont announced his nomination for election to the board of directors.

In 2017, Jeff was named a Commissioner at the Global Commission on the Stability of Cyberspace (GCSC). The GCSC is composed of 24 prominent independent Commissioners representing a wide range of geographic regions as well as government, industry, technical and civil society stakeholders with legitimacy to speak on different aspects of cyberspace. The commission's stated aim is to develop proposals for norms and policies to enhance international security and stability and guide responsible state and non-state behavior in cyberspace.

In 2017, Jeff spearheaded the creation of the DEF CON Voting Machine Village. Debuting at DEF CON 25, the Voting Machine Village allowed hackers to test the security of electronic voting machines, including several models still in active use in the US. The machines were all compromised over the course of the conference by DEF CON attendees, some within hours of the village's opening. The resulting media coverage of the vulnerability of all tested machines sparked a national conversation and inspired legislation in Virginia.

In September 2017, the Voting Machine Village produced "DEF CON 25 Voting Machine Hacking Village: Report on Cyber Vulnerabilities in US Election Equipment, Databases and Infrastructure" summarizing its findings. The findings were publicly released at an event sponsored by the Atlantic Council and the paper went on to win an O'Reilly Defender Research Award.

In March 2018, the DEF CON Voting Machine Hacking Village was awarded a Cybersecurity Excellence Award. The award cites both the spurring of a national dialog around securing the US election system and the release of the nation's first cybersecurity election plan.

In December 2021, Moss was appointed as one of twenty-three members of a newly formed US DHS CISA cybersecurity advisory council. Other notable members include Alex Stamos, Steve Adler, Bobby Chesney, Thomas Fanning, Vijaya Gadde, Patrick Gallagher, and Alicia Tate-Nadeau.

In 2024, Moss co-founded with Jake Braun an organization dedicated to improving cybersecurity of critical U.S. infrastructure like water supplies called DEF CON Franklin.

== Current position ==
Moss is currently based in Seattle, where he works as a security consultant for a company that is hired to test other companies' computer systems. He has been interviewed on issues including the internet situation between the United States and China, spoofing and other e-mail threats and the employment of hackers in a professional capacity, including in law enforcement.

== Film ==
Moss was an Executive Producer on DEFCON: The Documentary (2013). The film follows the four days of the conference, events and people (attendees and staff), and covers history and philosophy behind DEF CON's success and unique experiences. He was also a cast member in the film Code 2600. Moss also works with the technical consulting team for the television series Mr. Robot.

== Popular culture references ==
DEF CON was portrayed in The X-Files episode "Three of a Kind" featuring an appearance by the Lone Gunmen. DEF CON was portrayed as a United States government-sponsored convention instead of a civilian convention.

Actor Will Smith visited DEF CON 21 to watch a talk by Apollo Robbins, the gentleman thief, and to study the DEF CON culture for an upcoming movie role.
