= DEF CON =

Annual hacker gathering in Las Vegas, Nevada

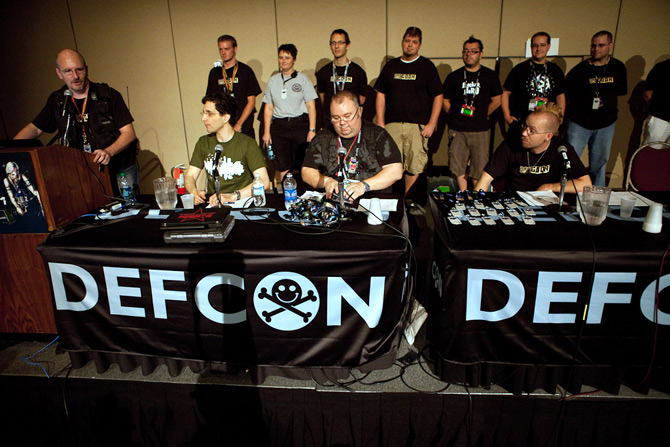
- Status: Active
- Genre: Security Conference, Hacker Conference
- Frequency: Annual
- Venue: Varies
- Locations: Las Vegas, Nevada
- Country: United States
- Years active: 33
- Inaugurated: June 9, 1993
- Founder: Jeff Moss
- Previous event: April 28–30 2026
- Attendance: Over 30,000
- Website: defcon.org; g7ejphhubv5idbbu3hb3wawrs5adw7tkx7yjabnf65xtzztgg4hcsqqd.onion ^{(Accessing link help)}

DEF CON (also written as DEFCON, Defcon, or DC) is a hacker convention held annually in Las Vegas, Nevada. The first DEF CON took place in June 1993 and today many attendees at DEF CON include computer security professionals, journalists, lawyers, federal government employees, security researchers, students, and hackers with a general interest in software, computer architecture, hardware modification, conference badges, and anything else that can be "hacked". The event consists of several tracks of speakers about computer and hacking-related subjects, as well as cyber-security challenges and competitions (known as hacking wargames). Contests held during the event are extremely varied and can range from creating the longest Wi-Fi connection to finding the most effective way to cool a beer in the Nevada heat.

Other contests, past and present, include lockpicking, robotics-related contests, art, slogan, coffee wars, scavenger hunt, and Capture the Flag. Capture the Flag (CTF) is perhaps the best known of these contests and is a hacking competition in which teams of hackers attempt to attack and defend computers and networks using software and network structures. CTF has been emulated at other hacking conferences as well as in academic and military contexts (as red team exercises).

Federal law enforcement agents from the FBI, DoD, United States Postal Inspection Service, DHS (via CISA) and other agencies regularly attend DEF CON. Some have considered DEF CON to be the "world's largest" hacker conference given its attendee size and the number of other conferences modeling themselves after it.

== History ==
=== Founding ===
DEF CON was founded in 1993, by then 18-year-old Jeff Moss as a farewell party for his friend, a fellow hacker and member of "Platinum Net", a FidoNet protocol based hacking network from Canada. The party was planned for Las Vegas a few days before his friend was to leave the United States, because his father had accepted employment out of the country. However, his friend's father left early, taking his friend along, so Jeff was left alone with the entire party planned. Jeff decided to invite all his hacker friends to go to Las Vegas with him and have the party with them instead. Hacker friends from far and wide got together and laid the foundation for DEF CON, with roughly 100 people in attendance.

The term DEF CON comes from the movie WarGames, referencing the U.S. Armed Forces defense readiness condition (DEF CON). In the movie, Las Vegas was selected as a nuclear target, and since the event was being hosted in Las Vegas, it occurred to Jeff Moss to name the convention DEF CON. However, to a lesser extent, CON also stands for convention and DEF is taken from the letters on the number 3 on a telephone keypad, a reference to phreakers. The official name of the conference includes a space in between DEF and CON.

Though intended to be a one-time event, Moss received overwhelmingly positive feedback from attendees, and decided to host the event for a second year at their urging. The event's attendance nearly doubled the second year, and has enjoyed continued success. For example, in 2019, an estimated 30,000 people attended DEF CON 27.

=== Documentary ===
For DEF CON's 20th Anniversary, a film was commissioned entitled DEF CON: The Documentary. The film follows the four days of the conference, events and people (attendees and staff), and covers history and philosophy behind DEF CON's success and unique experiences.

=== International Expansion ===
In January 2018, the DEF CON China Beta event was announced. The conference was held May 11–13, 2018 in Beijing, and marked DEF CON's first conference outside the United States. The second annual DEF CON China was canceled due to concerns related to COVID-19. On March 20, 2021, DEF CON held DEF CON China Party, a virtual reality event produced with Chinese technology company Baidu. In 2025, DEF CON offered programming in Bahrain at the November 5-6 Arab International Cybersecurity Conference and announced the 2026 launch of DEF CON Singapore.

=== COVID-19 ===
In 2020, due to safety concerns over COVID-19 the DEF CON 28 in-person Las Vegas event was cancelled and replaced with DEF CON Safe Mode, a virtual event planned for the same August 6–9 dates as DC 28.

In 2021, DEF CON 29 was held on August 5–8 in-person in Las Vegas and virtually (via Twitch and Discord). In-person attendees were required to wear masks in conference areas and to show proof of COVID-19 vaccination. Attendees with verified vaccine records (verified by a third party) were given a wristband which was required for entry into the conference areas.

== Components ==
=== Handles ===
Attendees at DEF CON and other Hacker conferences often utilize an alias or "handle" at conferences. This is in keeping with the hacker community's desire for anonymity. Some known handles include DEF CON founder Jeff Moss' handle of "Dark Tangent". A notable event at DEF CON is DEF CON 101 which starts off the conference and may offer the opportunity for an individual to come up on stage and be assigned a handle by a number of members of the community.

=== Badges ===
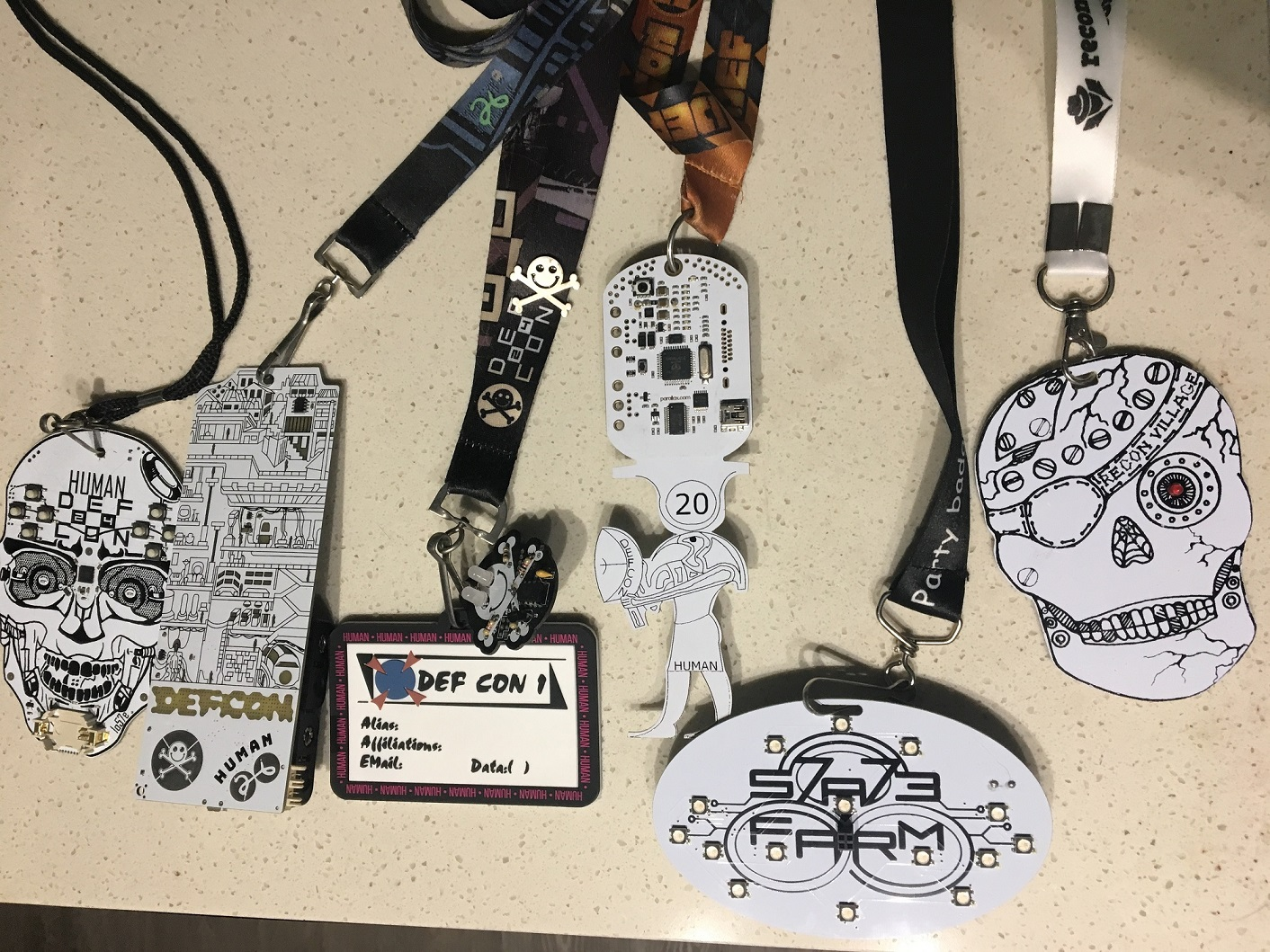
Multiple, electronic and non-electronic, DEF CON human badges along with other conference badges

A notable part of DEF CON is the conference badge, which identifies attendees and ensures attendees can access conference events and activities. The DEF CON badge has historically been notable because of its changing nature, sometimes being an electronic badge (PCB), with LEDs, or sometimes being a non-electronic badge such as a vinyl record. Conference badges often contain challenges or callbacks to hacker or other technology history, such as the usage of the Konami Code in the DEF CON 24 badge, or the DEF CON 25 badge reverting to the look of the DEF CON 1 badge. DEF CON Badges do not (generally) identify attendees by name; however, the badges are used to differentiate attendees from others. One way of doing this has been to have different badges, a general conference attendee (human) badge, a staff member (goon), Vendor, Speaker, Press, and other badges. In addition, individuals and organizations have begun creating their own badges in what has become known as badgelife. These badges may be purchased in many cases, or earned at the conference by completing challenges or events. Some badges may give the holder access to after hours events at the conference. In 2018, the evolution of this came with what was termed "shitty addon's" or SAOs. These were miniature (usually) PCBs that connected to the official and other badges that may extend functionality or were just collected.

=== Villages ===
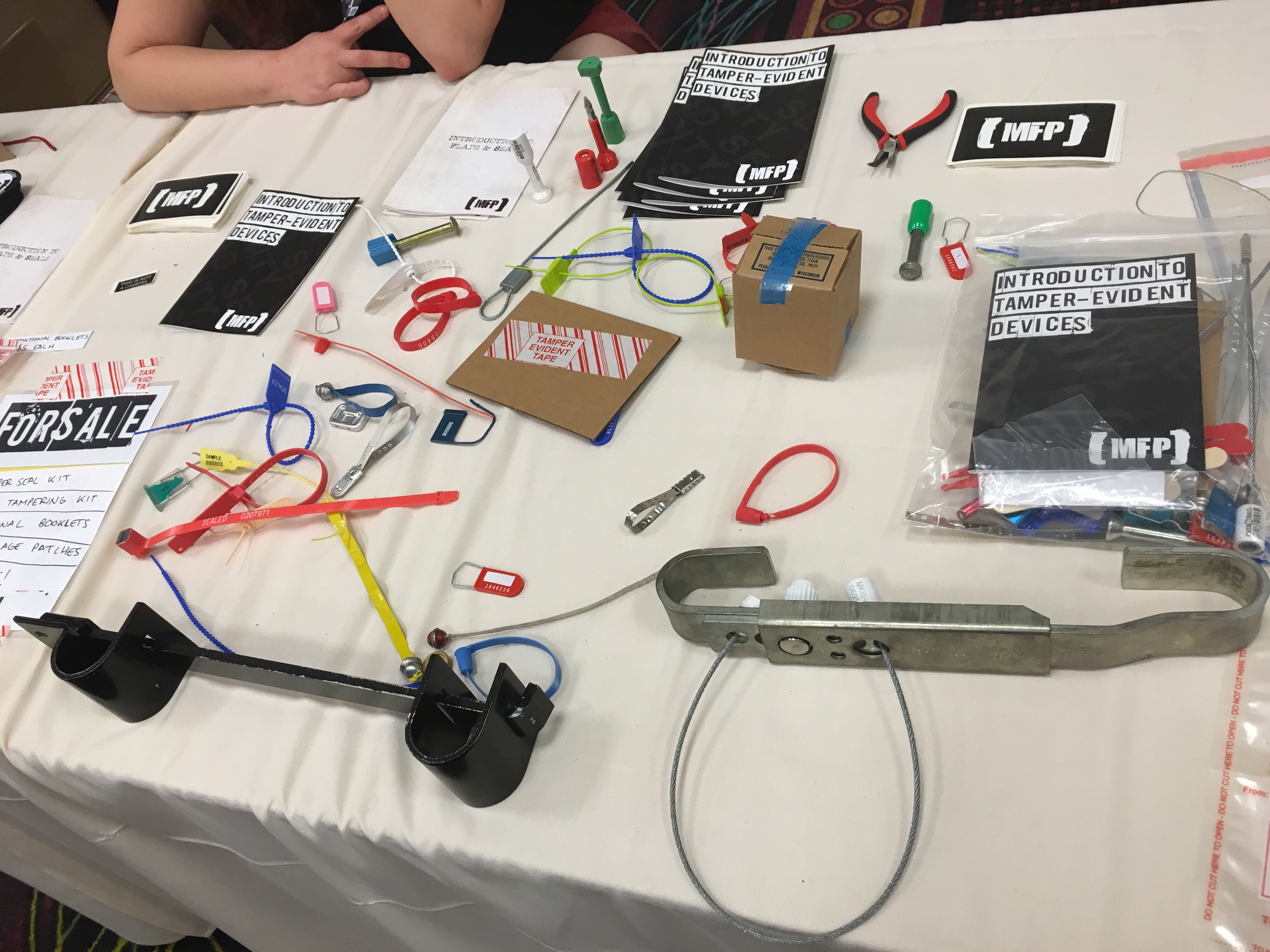
Tamper Village in 2016, which helped participants learn about weaknesses of tamper-evident technology

Villages are dedicated spaces arranged around a specific topic. Villages may be considered mini conferences within the con, with many holding their own independent talks as well as hands-on activities such as CTFs, or labs. Some villages include Aerospace Village, Car Hacking Village, IoT Village, Recon, biohacking, lockpicking, ham radio, and the well known social engineering and vote hacking villages. In 2018 the vote hacking village gained media attention due to concerns about US election systems security vulnerabilities.

=== Internal conferences ===
DEF CON has its own cultural underground which results in individuals wanting to create their own meetups or "cons" within DEF CON. These may be actual formal meetups or may be informal. Well known cons are:

- Queer Con, a meetup of LGBTQ community members.
- Linecon; any long line has the potential to turn into a con.
- QuietCon, a meetup to hang out or talk quietly away from the hustle and bustle of the rest of the conference attendees.

=== Workshops ===
Workshops are classes covering information security and related subjects. Workshops have been held on topics such as digital forensics investigation, hacking IoT devices, playing with RFID, fuzzing, and attacking smart devices.

=== Fundraising ===
Since DEF CON 11, fundraisers have been conducted for the Electronic Frontier Foundation (EFF). The first fundraiser was a dunk tank and was an "official" event. The EFF now has an event named "The Summit" hosted by the Vegas 2.0 crew that is an open event and fundraiser. DEF CON 18 (2010) hosted a new fundraiser called MohawkCon.

=== Parties ===
Social groups and companies also organize unofficial parties during DEF CON, including some large and extravagant events, although fewer in later years. A party in 2012 featured a private cell phone network operated from a van, the NinjaTel Van.

== Contests ==
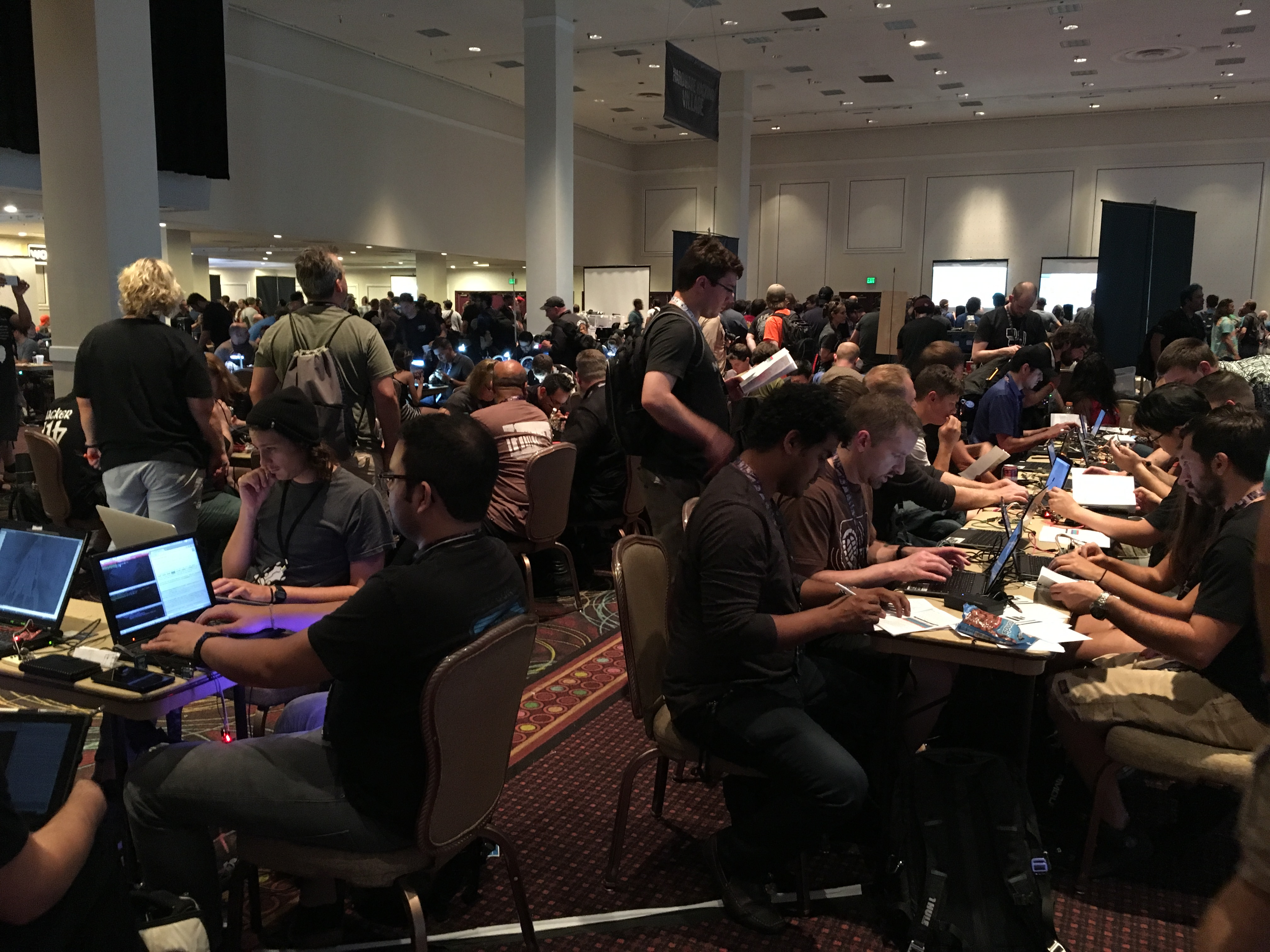
Contest work tables at DEF CON 24 in 2016

Within DEF CON there are many contests and events, including Capture the Flag, Hacker Jeopardy, Scavenger Hunt, Capture the Packet, Crash and Compile, and Hackfortress.

=== Black Badge ===
The Black Badge is the highest award DEF CON gives to contest winners of certain events. Capture the flag (CTF) winners sometimes earn these, as well as Hacker Jeopardy winners. The contests that are awarded Black Badges vary from year to year, and a Black Badge allows free entrance to DEF CON for life, potentially a value of thousands of dollars.

In April 2017, a DEF CON Black Badge was featured in an exhibit in the Smithsonian Institution's National Museum of American History entitled "Innovations in Defense: Artificial Intelligence and the Challenge of Cybersecurity". The badge belongs to ForAllSecure's Mayhem Cyber Reasoning System, the winner of the DARPA 2016 Cyber Grand Challenge at DEF CON 24 and the first non-human entity ever to earn a Black Badge.

=== Capture the Flag ===
The first instance of the DEF CON Capture the Flag (CTF) contest was held in 1996, at the 4th DEF CON, and has been held since then every year. It is one of few CTFs in an attack/defense format. The prize of the winning team is a couple of black badges.

==== Capture the Flag history ====
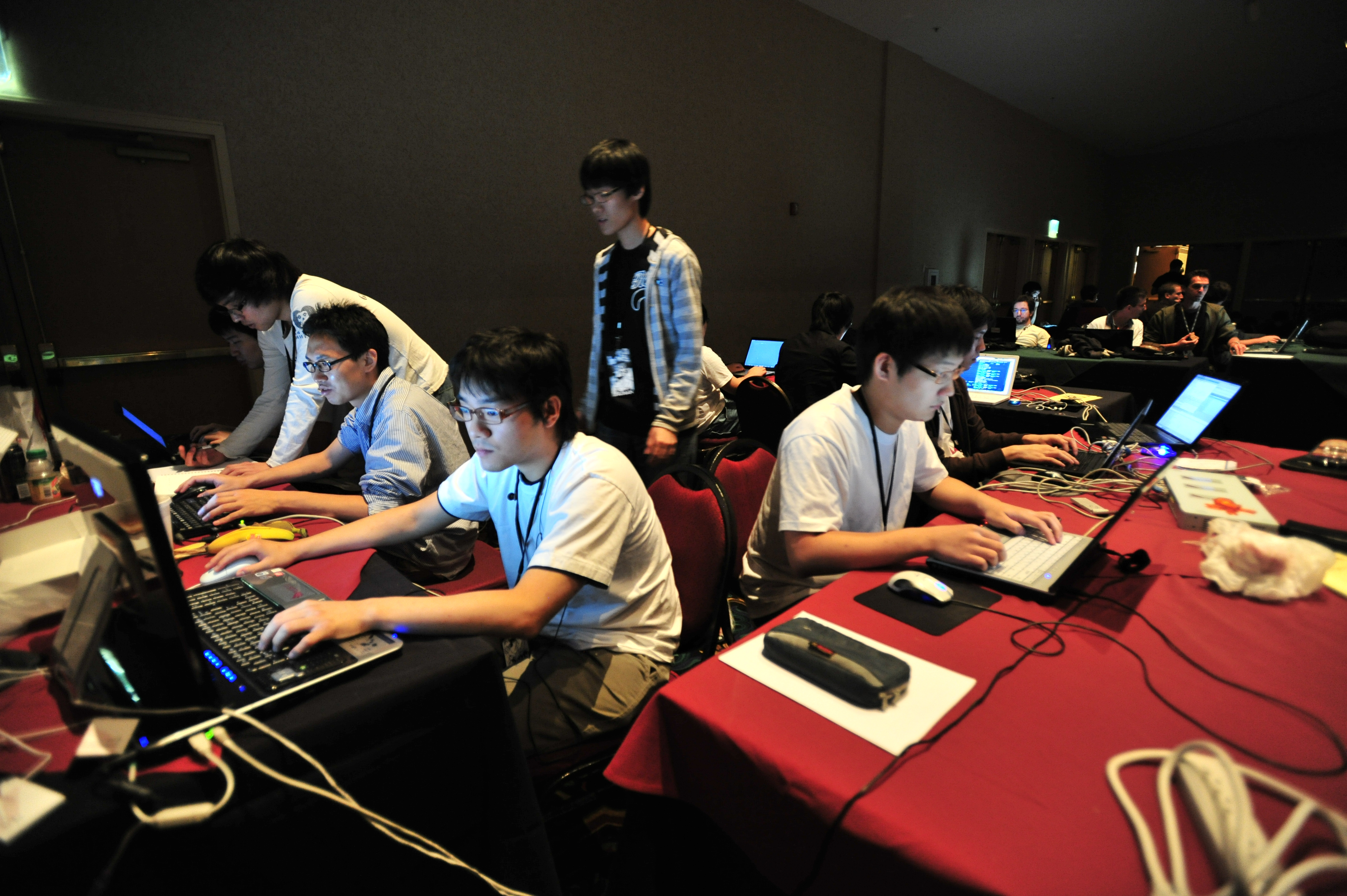
A team competing in the CTF competition at DEF CON 17

In 1996, the first DEF CON CTF was organized, with a couple of servers for participants to hack, and judges to decide if a machine has been hacked, and award points accordingly.

In 2002, the company Immunix took part in the game under the moniker "immunex", to benchmark the security of their Linux-based operating system, with modifications including StackGuard, FormatGuard, OpenWall's non-executable stack, SubDomain (the ancestor of AppArmor), ... Confident in their defense capabilities, they even opened access to their servers to other teams, and even spent some time taunting them. The team got the second place, and all their services deployed on their Immunix stack were never compromised. It was also the first year the contest had an organiser-provided services infrastructure connected to a real-time scoreboard.

In 2003, the game had become so popular that a qualification round was introduced, with the previous winner automatically qualified.

In 2008, the Sk3wl of Root team took advantage of a bug in the game (privilege dropping and forking were inverted), allowing them to have such a massive lead that they spent most of the CTF playing Guitar Hero.

In 2009, it was announced that "Diutinus Defense Technology Corp" (DDTEK) would be the new organisers, but nobody knew who they were. It was revealed at the end of the game that the team playing as sk3wl0fr00t was the organizer. "Hacking the top hacker contest seemed like a fun way to introduce ourselves to CTF organization. The yells of "bullshit" from CTF teams during the DEF CON 17 awards ceremony were very gratifying." said vulc@n, a member of DDTEK, on the topic.

In 2011, the team "lollerskaters dropping from roflcopters" used a zero-day vulnerability in FreeBSD (namely CVE-2011-4062) to escape jails, causing havoc in the game's infrastructure.

In 2016, the 15th edition of the CTF was done in partnership with the DARPA, as part of its Cyber Grand Challenge program, where teams wrote autonomous systems to play the game without any human interaction.

In 2017, the Legitimate Business Syndicate came up with their very own CPU architecture called cLEMENCy: a middle-endian with 9 bits bytes CPU. With its specifications released only 24 hours before the beginning of the CTF, it was designed with the explicit goals of both surprising the teams, and leveling the playing field by breaking all their tools.

Capture the Flag timeline
Year	DEF CON	Competing Teams	Organizers	Architecture	Platform	Winning team
1996	4		Goons			AJ Reznor
1997	5		Goons			AJ Reznor
1998	6		Goons			SNI
1999	7		Goons			Ghetto Hackers
2000	8		Goons			Ghetto Hackers
2001	9		Goons		Multiple	Ghetto Hackers & digirev
2002	10		Ghetto Hackers		Redhat 6.2	Digital Revelation
2003	11	8	Ghetto Hackers		OpenBSD	Anomaly
2004	12	8	Ghetto Hackers	i386	Windows	sk3wl0fr00t
2005	13	8	Kenshoto	i386	FreeBSD 5.4	shellphish
2006	14	8	Kenshoto	i386	Solaris 10	1@stplace
2007	15	8	Kenshoto	i386	FreeBSD	1@stplace
2008	16	8	Kenshoto	i386	FreeBSD	Sk3wl of Root
2009	17	9	DDTEK	i386	FreeBSD	VedaGodz
2010	18	12	DDTEK	i386	FreeBSD & Debian	ACME Pharm
2011	19	12	DDTEK	i386	FreeBSD	European Nopsleders
2012	20	20	DDTEK	i386	FreeBSD	Samurai
2013	21	20	Legitimate Business Syndicate	armv7	Linux	Plaid Parliament of Pwning
2014	22	20	Legitimate Business Syndicate	armv7 & i386	Linux	Plaid Parliament of Pwning
2015	23	15	Legitimate Business Syndicate	MIPS, x86 & armv7	Linux	DEFKOR
2016	24	15	Legitimate Business Syndicate	i386	DECREE	Plaid Parliament of Pwning
2017	25	15	Legitimate Business Syndicate	cLEMENCy	cLEMENCy	Plaid Parliament of Pwning
2018	26	24	Order Of the Overflow	MIPS, x86 & armv7	Linux	DEFKOR00T
2019	27	16	Order Of the Overflow	x86, arm64, esoteric	Linux, iOS, Xbox	Plaid Parliament of Pwning
2020	28	16	Order Of the Overflow	x86, esoteric	Linux	A*0*E
2021	29	16	Order Of the Overflow	x86, microengine	Linux	Katzebin
2022	30	16	Nautilus Institute	mixed		Maple Mallard Magistrates
2023	31	12	Nautilus Institute	mixed		Maple Mallard Magistrates
2024	32	12	Nautilus Institute	mixed		Maple Mallard Magistrates
2025	33	12	Nautilus Institute	mixed		Maple Mallard Magistrates

== Groups ==
DEF CON Groups are worldwide, local chapters of hackers, thinkers, makers and others. DEF CON Groups were started as a splinter off of the 2600 meetup groups because of concerns over politicization. Local DEF CON groups are formed and are posted online. DEF CON Groups are usually identified by the area code of the area where they are located in the US, and by other numbers when outside of the US e.g., DC801, DC201. DEF CON Groups may seek permission to make a logo that includes the official DEF CON logo with approval.

== Notable incidents ==
Following are a list of high-profile issues which have garnered significant media attention.

Year	Description
1999	On July 10, 1999, the Cult of the Dead Cow hacker collective released Back Orifice 2000 (later discovered to be infected with the CIH virus) at DEF CON 7, in what was, at the time, the largest presentation in DEF CON history.
2001	On July 16, 2001, Russian programmer Dmitry Sklyarov was arrested the day after DEF CON for writing software to decrypt Adobe's e-book format.
2005	On July 31, 2005, Cisco used legal threats to suppress Mike Lynn from presenting at DEF CON about flaws he had found in the Cisco IOS used on routers.
2007	In August 2007, Michelle Madigan, a reporter for Dateline NBC, attempted to secretly record hackers admitting to crimes at the convention. After being outed by DEF CON founder Jeff Moss during an assembly, she was heckled and chased out of the convention by attendees for her use of covert audio and video recording equipment. DEF CON staff tried to get Madigan to obtain a press pass before the outing happened. A DEF CON source at NBC had tipped off organizers to Madigan's plans.
2008	Main article: Massachusetts Bay Transportation Authority v. Anderson MIT students Zack Anderson, R.J. Ryan and Alessandro Chiesa were to present a session entitled "The Anatomy of a Subway Hack: Breaking Crypto RFIDS and Magstripes of Ticketing Systems." The presentation description included the phrase "Want free subway rides for life?" and promised to focus on the Boston T subway. However, the Massachusetts Bay Transit Authority (MBTA) sued the students and MIT in United States District Court in Massachusetts on August 8, 2008, claiming that the students violated the Computer Fraud and Abuse Act (CFAA) by delivering information to conference attendees that could be used to defraud the MBTA of transit fares. The court issued a temporary restraining order prohibiting the students from disclosing the material for a period of ten days, despite the fact the material had already been disseminated to DEF CON attendees at the start of the show. In 2008's contest "Race to Zero", contestants submitted a version of given malware which was required to be undetectable by all of the antivirus engines in each round. The contest concept attracted much negative attention.
2009	WIRED reported that an ATM kiosk was positioned in the conference center of the Riviera Hotel Casino capturing data from an unknown number of hackers attending the DEF CON hacker conference.
2011	Security company HBGary Federal used legal threats to prevent former CEO Aaron Barr from attending a panel discussion at the conference.
2012	The director of the National Security Agency, Keith B. Alexander, gave the keynote speech. During the question and answers session, the first question for Alexander, fielded by Jeff Moss, was "Does the NSA really keep a file on everyone, and if so, how can I see mine?" Alexander replied "Our job is foreign intelligence" and that "Those who would want to weave the story that we have millions or hundreds of millions of dossiers on people, is absolutely false…From my perspective, this is absolute nonsense." On March 12, 2013, during a United States Senate Select Committee on Intelligence hearing, Senator Ron Wyden quoted the 2012 DEF CON keynote speech and asked Director of National Intelligence James Clapper if the U.S. conducted domestic surveillance; Clapper made statements saying that there was no intentional domestic surveillance. In June 2013, NSA surveillance programs which collected data on US citizens, such as PRISM, had been exposed. Andy Greenberg of Forbes said that NSA officials, including Alexander, in the years 2012 and 2013 "publicly denied–often with carefully hedged words–participating in the kind of snooping on Americans that has since become nearly undeniable."
2013	On July 11, 2013, Jeff Moss posted a statement, located on the DEF CON blog, titled "Feds, We Need Some Time Apart". It stated that "I think it would be best for everyone involved if the feds call a 'time-out' and not attend DEF CON this year." This was the first time in the organization's history that it had asked federal authorities not to attend. Actor Will Smith visited the convention to study the DEF CON culture for an upcoming movie role.
2016	On August 4, 2016, DEF CON and DARPA co-hosted the 2016 Cyber Grand Challenge, a first-of-its-kind all-machine hacking tournament. Competing teams had to create a bot capable of handling all aspects of offense and defense with complete autonomy. Seven finalists competed for a US$2M grand prize. The winner of the Cyber Grand Challenge was "Mayhem", an AI created by ForAllSecure of Pittsburgh, Pennsylvania. Mayhem then went on to participate in the previously humans-only DEF CON Capture the Flag Contest, where it finished in last place, despite pulling ahead of human teams often in a contest for which it was not specifically designed.
2017	At the "Voting Machine Village" event, dozens of voting machines brought to the conference were breached. In September 2017, the Voting Machine Village produced "DEF CON 25 Voting Machine Hacking Village: Report on Cyber Vulnerabilities in US Election Equipment, Databases and Infrastructure" summarizing its findings. The findings were publicly released at an event sponsored by the Atlantic Council and the paper went on to win an O'Reilly Defender Research Award. Marcus Hutchins, better known online by his handle MalwareTech, the 23-year-old British security researcher who was credited with stopping the WannaCry outbreak was arrested by the FBI at the airport preparing to leave the country after attending DEF CON over his alleged involvement with the Kronos banking trojan.
2018	In March 2018, the DEF CON Voting Machine Hacking Village was awarded a Cybersecurity Excellence Award. The award cites both the spurring of a national dialog around securing the US election system and the release of the nation's first cybersecurity election plan.
2020	On May 8, 2020, the DEF CON in-person conference itself was cancelled and virtualized due to COVID-19. DEF CON Safe Mode was held August 6–9 online with a full roster of talks, villages, contests and events.
2024	On February 4, 2024, Caesar's Entertainment cancelled the contract with DEF CON without warning with speculation that a ransomware attack and bomb scare and subsequent evacuation in 2023 were in part to blame. The conference was moved to the Las Vegas Convention Center as a result.

== Entertainment references ==
- DEF CON was also portrayed in The X-Files episode "Three of a Kind" featuring an appearance by The Lone Gunmen. DEF CON was portrayed as a United States government–sponsored convention instead of a civilian convention.
- A semi-fictionalized account of DEF CON 2, "Cyber Christ Meets Lady Luck", written by Winn Schwartau, demonstrates some of the early DEF CON culture.
- A trip to DEF CON for a hacker showdown figures into the plot of The Signal. Director William Eubank came to Las Vegas and screened the film at DEF CON Movie Night.
- A fictionalized version of DEF CON called "EXOCON" is the setting for the climax of Jason Bourne, the fifth film of the Bourne film series. The primary antagonist of the film, a fictionalized CIA director, played by Tommy Lee Jones, is a keynote speaker at the event, mimicking DEF CON 20's controversial keynote speaker, NSA director Keith B. Alexander.
- In the Mr. Robot Season 3 opener "eps3.0_power-saver-mode.h" Elliot and Darlene visit a qualifying tournament for the DEF CON Capture the Flag (CTF) contest. DEF CON's smiley-face-and-crossbones mascot Jack is visible among the set decorations, and the scene is accompanied musically by a track from DEF CON 24's official soundtrack; 'Razorgirl' by Dubvirus.
- Documentarian Werner Herzog included DEF CON in his 2016 film Lo and Behold, Reveries of the Connected World, a film described as a "playful yet chilling examination of our rapidly interconnecting online lives".

== Venues, dates, and attendance ==
Each conference venue and date has been extracted from the DEF CON archives for easy reference.

Conference Name	Venue	Duration	Year	Attendance
DEF CON 34	Las Vegas Convention Center	August 6-9	2026	N/A
DEF CON 33	Las Vegas Convention Center	August 7–10	2025	~26,000
DEF CON 32	Las Vegas Convention Center and The Sahara	August 8–11	2024	~27,300
DEF CON 31	Caesars Forum, Flamingo, Harrah's Hotel, and Linq Hotel	August 10–13	2023	~25,000
DEF CON 30	Caesars Forum, Flamingo, Harrah's Hotel, and Linq Hotel	August 11–14	2022	~25,000
DEF CON 29	Paris Hotel and Bally's Hotel	August 5–8	2021	~8,700
DEF CON Safe Mode	Virtual event	August 6–9	2020	N/A
DEF CON 28	Planned Caesars Forum, Harrah's, The Linq, and Flamingo	August 6–9	2020	0
DEF CON 27	Paris Hotel, Bally's Hotel, Planet Hollywood, and Flamingo	August 8–11	2019	~30,000
DEF CON China 1.0	751 D-Park	May 31–June 2	2019	Unknown
DEF CON 26	Caesars Palace and Flamingo	August 9–12	2018	28,000
DEF CON China [Beta]	Kuntai Hotel (Beijing)	May 11–13	2018	Unknown
DEF CON 25	Caesars Palace	July 27–30	2017	25,000
DEF CON 24	Paris Hotel and Bally's Hotel	August 4–7	2016	22,000
DEF CON 23	Paris Hotel and Bally's Hotel	August 6–9	2015	16,000+
DEF CON 22	Rio Hotel & Casino	August 7–10	2014	16,000
DEF CON 21	Rio Hotel & Casino	August 1–4	2013	12,000
DEF CON 20	Rio Hotel & Casino	July 26–29	2012	Unknown
DEF CON 19	Rio Hotel & Casino	August 4–7	2011	Unknown
DEF CON 18	Riviera Hotel & Casino	July 30–August 1	2010	Unknown
DEF CON 17	Riviera Hotel & Casino	July 30–August 2	2009	Unknown
DEF CON 16	Riviera Hotel & Casino	August 8–10	2008	8,000
DEF CON 15	Riviera Hotel & Casino	August 3–5	2007	Unknown
DEF CON 14	Riviera Hotel & Casino	August 4–6	2006	Unknown
DEF CON 13	Alexis Park Resort	July 29–31	2005	Unknown
DEF CON 12	Alexis Park Resort	July 30–August 1	2004	Unknown
DEF CON 11	Alexis Park Resort	August 1–3	2003	Unknown
DEF CON 10	Alexis Park Resort	August 2–4	2002	Unknown
DEF CON 9	Alexis Park Resort	July 13–15	2001	Unknown
DEF CON 8	Alexis Park Resort	July 28–30	2000	Unknown
DEF CON 7	Alexis Park Resort	July 9–11	1999	Unknown
DEF CON 6	Plaza Hotel & Casino	July 31–August 2	1998	Unknown
DEF CON 5	Aladdin Hotel & Casino	July 11–13	1997	Unknown
DEF CON 4	Monte Carlo Resort and Casino	July 26–28	1996	Unknown
DEF CON 3	Tropicana Resort & Casino	August 4–6	1995	Unknown
DEF CON 2	Sahara Hotel and Casino	July 22–24	1994	~200
DEF CON 1	Sands Hotel and Casino	June 9–11	1993	~100

== See also ==
- Black Hat Briefings
- Chaos Communication Congress (C3)
- Electronic voting
- Hack-Tic, a quadrennial European convention
- Hackers on Planet Earth (HOPE)
- Security BSides, a community supported conference with locations across the globe
- Summercon, the first American hacker conference, organized by members of Phrack
