= Magee, Mississippi =

- City
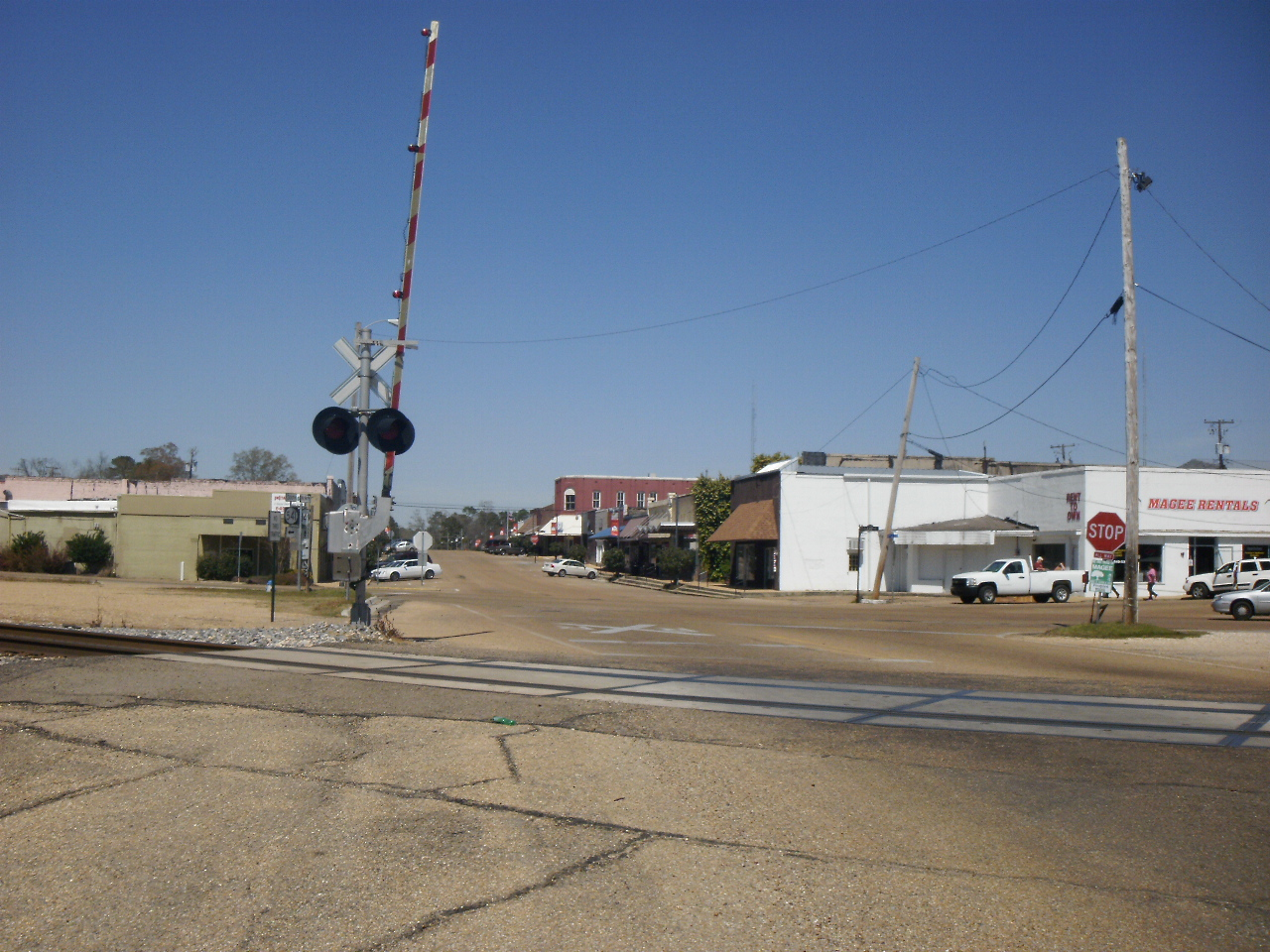
- Downtown Magee in March 2013

- Flag

- Location of Magee, Mississippi

- Location in the United States
- Coordinates: 31°52′22″N 89°44′1″W
- Country: United States
- State: Mississippi
- County: Simpson
- City: February 25, 1900

Government
  - Type: Mayor-Council
  - Mayor: Dale Berry
  - Board of Aldermen: Mark Grubbs; Lewana Thompson; Sammie Tebo; Patrick Brown; Sue Honea

Area
  - Total: 5.26 sq mi (13.62 km^{2})
  - Land: 5.26 sq mi (13.62 km^{2})
  - Water: 0 sq mi (0.00 km^{2})
- Elevation: 433 ft (132 m)

Population (2020)
  - Total: 3,988
  - Density: 758/sq mi (292.8/km^{2})
- Time zone: UTC−6 (Central (CST))
  - Summer (DST): UTC−5 (CDT)
- ZIP code: 39111
- Area code: 601
- FIPS code: 28-44600
- GNIS feature ID: 0673055
- Website: www.cityofmagee.ms.gov

Magee is a city in Simpson County, Mississippi, United States. It is part of the Jackson metropolitan area. As of the 2020 census, Magee had a population of 3,988.

== History ==
The first settlers in the area were Arthur Mangum and Phil Magee, who came into the area around 1820. Pioneers from Virginia and the Carolinas followed. The town of Magee was originally named Mangum, after Arthur Mangum; it kept this name until 1859.

In 1840, Willis Magee built a grist mill on Little Goodwater Creek, inside the present city limits. He started the first and only postal service in the area in 1855.

Robert Solomon Magee was the first post master in Magee and the city of Magee was named after him.

Richard Farthing came to Magee in 1859 when he was in the leather tanning business. He bought 80 acres of land and also built a tanyard and used water from the mill pond to tan his leather. The population of Magee in 1919 was 786. There were approximately 23 businesses in the area at the time.

Magee is approximately 42 miles south of Jackson, 45 miles north of Hattiesburg, and 12 miles south of Mendenhall, the county seat of Simpson County.

Magee's first mayor was R.P. Vinson, who served from 1900 to 1907.

In 2013, First Baptist Church in downtown Magee was seriously damaged by a fire but has been restored.

Windham's Restaurant is located in Magee, and was established in 1963, locally known as "Zip's". In 2015, the Zip Burger was voted the best hamburger in Mississippi.

In 2017, the Magee Sportsplex was renamed the Jimmy Clyde Sportsplex in honor of former Magee mayor Jimmy Clyde.

As of 2017, the mayor of Magee is Dale Berry.

The city of Magee was featured in the Discovery Channel reality TV series Dirty Jobs.

== Geography ==
According to the United States Census Bureau, the city has a total area of 4.9 square miles (13 km^{2}), all land. Magee is located between Jackson and Hattiesburg on U.S. Highway 49 at the intersection of three Mississippi Highways: 541, 545, and 28. Magee is approximately 155 miles north of New Orleans, Louisiana, and approximately 142 miles north of Mobile, Alabama.

=== Climate ===
Magee has a humid subtropical climate, with an annual mean temperature 65.8 degrees and average annual rainfall of 56.9 inches (1,450 mm).

=== March 2009 tornado ===
On March 26, 2009, around 1:30 a.m., an EF3 tornado struck the north part of the city. The tornado destroyed 60 homes and caused 25 injuries, with no fatalities. The tornado significantly damaged the town's water treatment plant, interrupting service to the entire town. Circuit Riders and other technicians from the Mississippi Rural Water Association worked with the city staff, local contractors and the Mississippi Emergency Management Agency to restore water service. Using four MEMA generators, the rural water staff was able to restore service to Magee by 2:20 p.m. the next day.

== Demographics ==
Historical population
Census	Pop.	Note	%±
1910	685		—
1920	730		6.6%
1930	964		32.1%
1940	1,221		26.7%
1950	1,738		42.3%
1960	2,039		17.3%
1970	2,973		45.8%
1980	3,497		17.6%
1990	3,607		3.1%
2000	4,200		16.4%
2010	4,408		5.0%
2020	3,988		−9.5%
U.S. Decennial Census

=== 2020 census ===
As of the 2020 census, Magee had a population of 3,988. The median age was 35.1 years. 27.0% of residents were under the age of 18 and 15.0% of residents were 65 years of age or older. For every 100 females there were 93.8 males, and for every 100 females age 18 and over there were 85.1 males age 18 and over.

0.0% of residents lived in urban areas, while 100.0% lived in rural areas.

There were 1,468 households in Magee, of which 36.0% had children under the age of 18 living in them. Of all households, 30.3% were married-couple households, 20.7% were households with a male householder and no spouse or partner present, and 40.7% were households with a female householder and no spouse or partner present. About 30.9% of all households were made up of individuals and 11.8% had someone living alone who was 65 years of age or older.

There were 1,708 housing units, of which 14.1% were vacant. The homeowner vacancy rate was 3.3% and the rental vacancy rate was 9.6%.

Racial composition as of the 2020 census
Race	Number	Percent
White	1,790	44.9%
Black or African American	1,909	47.9%
American Indian and Alaska Native	8	0.2%
Asian	37	0.9%
Native Hawaiian and Other Pacific Islander	1	0.0%
Some other race	95	2.4%
Two or more races	148	3.7%
Hispanic or Latino (of any race)	131	3.3%

=== Demographic estimates ===
Magee racial composition as of 2023
Race	Num.	Perc.
White (non-Hispanic)	1,702	42.6%
Black or African American (non-Hispanic)	1,966	49.2%
Two Races Including Other (Hispanic)	161	4.05%
Other (Hispanic)	116	2.92%
White (Hispanic)	41	1.03%

As of 2024, the U.S. Census Bureau estimated that there were 3,943 people and 1,264 households residing in the city.

== Economy ==
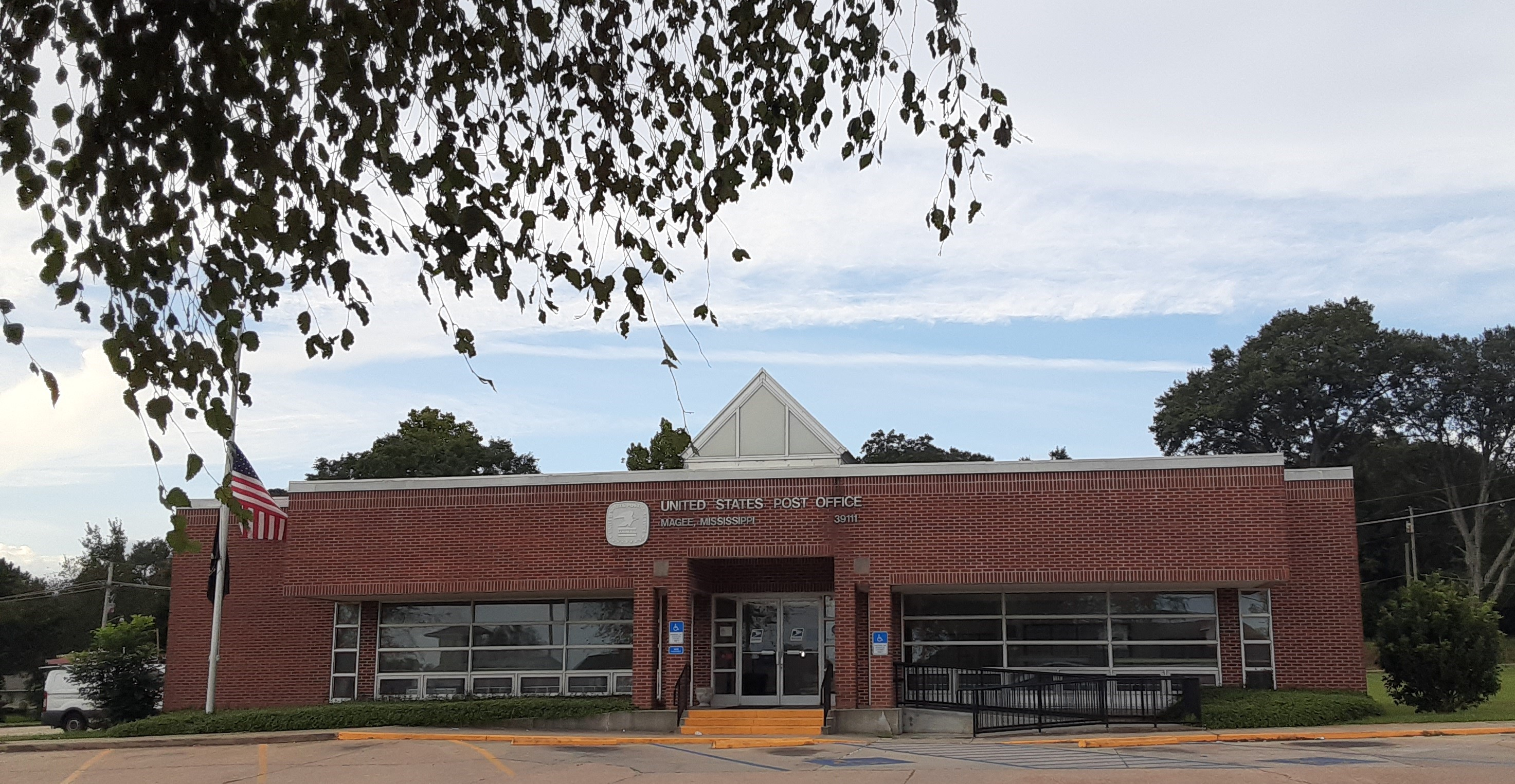
Magee Post Office

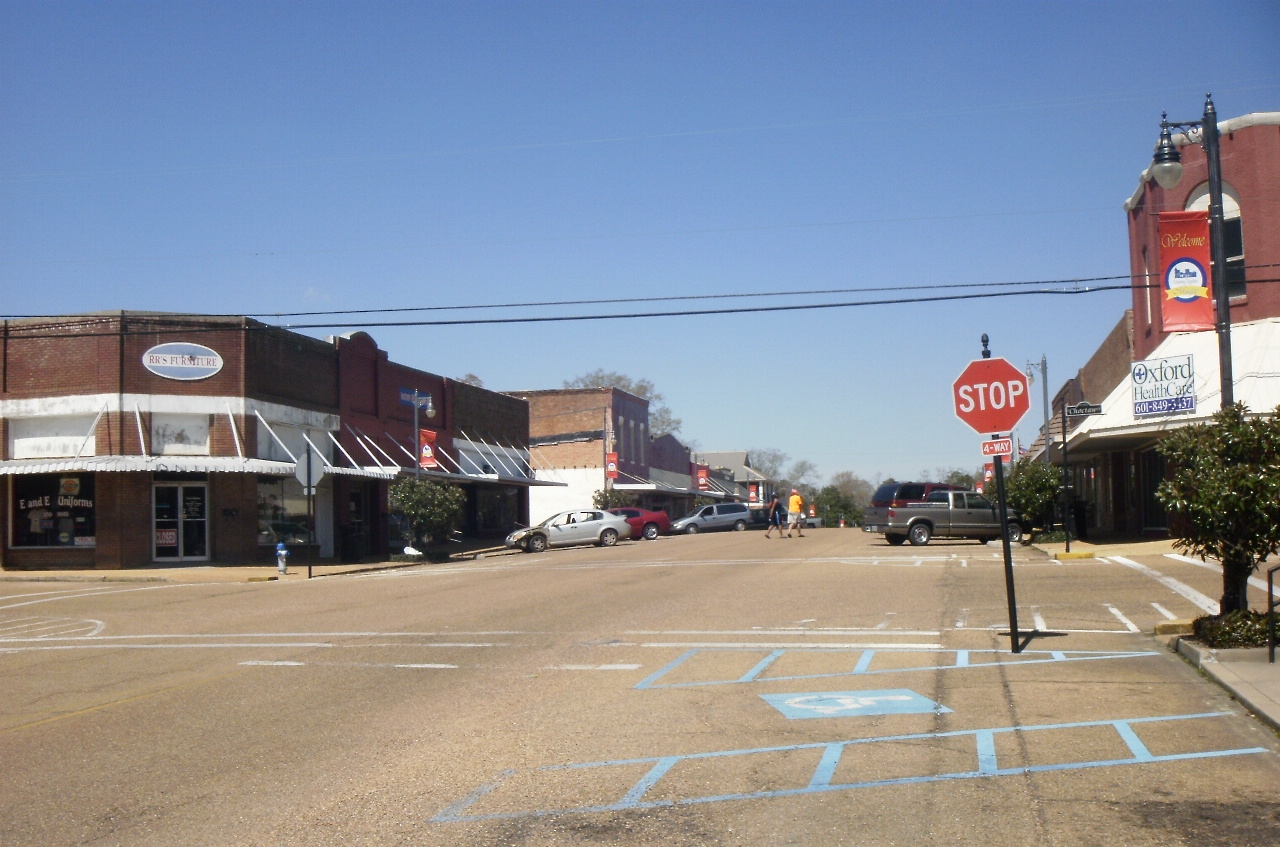
Main Street

Prominent area industries include Tyson Foods, Polk's Meat Products, Real Pure Beverage Group, and Howard Industry.

The Simpson County Development Foundation Industrial Park is an ultramodern, 205-acre (0.83 km^{2}) industrial park located on four-lane Highway 49.

== Arts and culture ==
The Chamber of Commerce sponsors the annual Homecoming, the Christmas Parade, tree lighting and caroling.

Crazy Day is an annual event on Main Street, traditionally held the third Saturday of the month of September. Locals set up booths to sell products or homemade goods.

Magee is also the home of the former Broadcountry Cinema 3 Theater, opened in 1985 and owned by Butch McCall. The theater was closed in 2010. The theater now serves as the location of Shining Starz ABA Autism Therapy.

A new civic center provides space for meetings for civic clubs and other organizations and houses the Magee Chamber of Commerce office.

Magee Public Library, the first public library in Magee, was established in 1935. Maude Turner was librarian. In 1937, the library was named Mims Williams Memorial Library. It is now a member of the Central Mississippi Regional Library System. The new library was built in 1975.

== Education ==
The City of Magee is served by the Simpson County School District.

=== Public schools ===
- Magee High School
- Magee Middle School
- Magee Elementary

=== Higher learning ===
A branch of Copiah-Lincoln Community College is located in Magee.

== Media ==
=== Newspapers ===
The Magee Courier and Simpson County News serve Magee.

=== Online news ===
Mageenews.com serves the local area.

=== Radio and television ===
- WSJC 810 AM (talk radio)
- WKXI 107.5 FM (urban adult contemporary)
- WSMP-LP 96.9 FM (owned by Church Alive)
- WRBJ-TV channel 34, a television station licensed to Magee, but serving Jackson and with no presence in Magee

== Infrastructure ==
=== Transportation ===
- Highways: U.S. Hwy 49; State Highways 28, 545, and 541.
- Railroad: Canadian National Railway (formally Illinois Central) serves the Magee area.
- Bus lines: Greyhound Bus serves the area.
- Airport: The Magee Municipal Airport (FAA identifier 17M) is located three miles west of Magee. It maintains a lighted 3,104 ft (946 m) × 50 ft (15 m) runway and is attended 24 hours a day. There is a hangar, lobby and office building complex (no control tower). The complex is equipped with automatic dusk to dawn lights, a beacon, and a wind directional device.

=== Public services ===
A new city hall, police station and city jail have been completed. There are 16 full-time police personnel, including the Chief of Police and 12 auxiliary officers.

Magee has 36 trained volunteer firemen and one full-time Fire Marshall, four class A pumpers, 1 class A pumper/tanker, 1 ladder truck, one rescue unit and two utility trucks. Emergency medical services are provided by ASAP EMS, CORP.

In the Magee, Mississippi National Guard Unit, there are 149 members with five full-time personnel.

== Notable people ==
- Roland Dale, professional football player
- Bo Davis, professional football coach
- Woody Evans, librarian and writer
- Carlos Funchess, college basketball coach
- Justin Griffith, professional football player
- Ed Hardy, professional football player
- Micah Xavier Johnson, perpetrator of the 2016 Dallas ambush
- Jarrian Jones, professional football player
- John Mangum, professional football player and father of John and Kris
- John Mangum Jr., professional football player
- Kris Mangum, professional football player
- Dan Monroe Russell Jr., United States federal judge
- Terrill Shaw, professional football player
- Harold Shaw, professional football player
- Prentiss Walker, farmer, businessman and politician
- Joseph Warren, member of the Mississippi House of Representatives
