= Mangum (surname) =

Mangum is a surname. Notable people with the surname include:

- Crystal Mangum, American woman who perpetrated the 2006 Duke University lacrosse rape hoax and later murdered her partner
- Dusty Mangum (born 1983), American football player
- Jake Mangum (born 1996), American baseball player
- Jeff Mangum (born 1970), American musician and songwriter
- John Mangum (disambiguation), several people
- Jonathan Mangum (born 1971), American actor and comedian
- Kris Mangum (born 1973), American football player
- Pete Mangum (1931–2000), American football player
- Tanner Mangum (born 1993), American football player
- Willie Person Mangum (1792–1861), American politician
