= Mangum =

Mangum may refer to:

- Mangum (surname)
- Mangum, Oklahoma
- Mangum Mound Site
