= John Mangum =

John Mangum may refer to:

- John Mangum (defensive back) (born 1967), American football defensive back for the Chicago Bears
- John Mangum (defensive tackle) (1942–1994), his father, American football defensive tackle for the Boston Patriots
- John D. Mangum (c. 1859–1918), Michigan politician
