= John Mangum (defensive back) =

American football player (born 1967)

No. 26
- Position: Defensive back

Personal information
- Born: March 16, 1967 (age 59); Magee, Mississippi, U.S.
- Listed height: 5 ft 10 in (1.78 m)
- Listed weight: 192 lb (87 kg)

Career information
- High school: Magee (MS)
- College: Alabama
- NFL draft: 1990: 6th round, 144th overall pick

Career history
- Tampa Bay Buccaneers (1990)*; Chicago Bears (1990–1998)
- * Offseason or practice squad member only

Awards and highlights
- Second-team All-American (1989); First-team All-SEC (1989); Second-team All-SEC (1987)

Career NFL statistics
- Tackles: 306
- Sacks: 4.5
- Interceptions: 5
- Stats at Pro Football Reference

John Wayne Mangum Jr. (born March 16, 1967) is an American former professional football player who played nine seasons in the National Football League (NFL) from 1990 to 1998 for the Chicago Bears. He played collegiately at Alabama and holds the career record for passes broken up (47).

== Early life ==
John Wayne Mangum Jr. was born on March 16, 1967, in Magee, Mississippi. His father is John Mangum Sr. (1942–1994), a former football player best known as the defensive tackle for the Boston Patriots from 1966 to 1967. He is the brother of former NFL football player Kris Mangum, best known as the tight end for the Carolina Panthers from 1997 to 2006.

== Professional career ==
Mangum was a sixth-round (144th overall) draft choice in the 1990 NFL draft. He played for the Chicago Bears between 1990 and 1998. He finished his Bears career with 272 tackles, 4.5 sacks, 5 interceptions, and 2 forced fumbles.

== Personal life ==
Mangum currently works in Jackson, Mississippi, as a senior vice president and financial advisor for CapTrust independent investment advisor and asset management firm. He is the father of three children: Bailey, Abbey and Jake. His son Jake is an outfielder for the Pittsburgh Pirates of Major League Baseball.
