= Hurricane Gustav =

Category 4 Atlantic hurricane in 2008

- Gustav near peak intensity and approaching western Cuba on August 30

Meteorological history
- Formed: August 25, 2008
- Extratropical: September 4, 2008
- Dissipated: September 7, 2008

Category 4 major hurricane
- 1-minute sustained (SSHWS/NWS)
- Highest winds: 155 mph (250 km/h)
- Highest gusts: 210 mph (340 km/h)
- Lowest pressure: 941 mbar (hPa); 27.79 inHg

Overall effects
- Fatalities: 153 (112 direct, 41 indirect)
- Damage: $8.31 billion (2008 USD)
- Areas affected: Lesser Antilles, Greater Antilles, United States Gulf Coast, Oklahoma, Arkansas, Tennessee, Missouri, Illinois, Michigan
- IBTrACS
- Part of the 2008 Atlantic hurricane season

Hurricane Gustav (/ˈɡʊstɑːv/) was the second most destructive tropical cyclone of the 2008 Atlantic hurricane season. The seventh tropical cyclone, third hurricane, and second major hurricane of the season, Gustav caused serious damage and casualties in Haiti, the Dominican Republic, Jamaica, the Cayman Islands, Cuba and the United States. Gustav caused at least $8.31 billion (2008 USD) in damages.

It formed on the morning of August 25, 2008, about 260 miles (420 km) southeast of Port-au-Prince, Haiti, and rapidly strengthened into a tropical storm that afternoon and into a hurricane early on August 26. Later that day it made landfall near the Haitian town of Jacmel. It inundated Jamaica and ravaged Western Cuba and then steadily moved across the Gulf of Mexico.

Once into the Gulf, Gustav gradually weakened because of increased wind shear and dry air. It weakened to a Category 2 hurricane late on August 31, and remained at that intensity until landfall on the morning of September 1 near Cocodrie, Louisiana. Weakening continued, and Gustav weakened to a tropical storm that evening and to a tropical depression the next day as it meandered around the south-central US. The weak system became extratropical on September 4 and was absorbed by another low on September 5.

In total, an estimated 153 deaths had been attributed to Gustav in the U.S. and Caribbean. Damage in the U.S. totaled to $6 billion (2008 USD) with additional damage of $2.1 billion in Cuba and $210 million in damage in Jamaica.

== Meteorological history ==
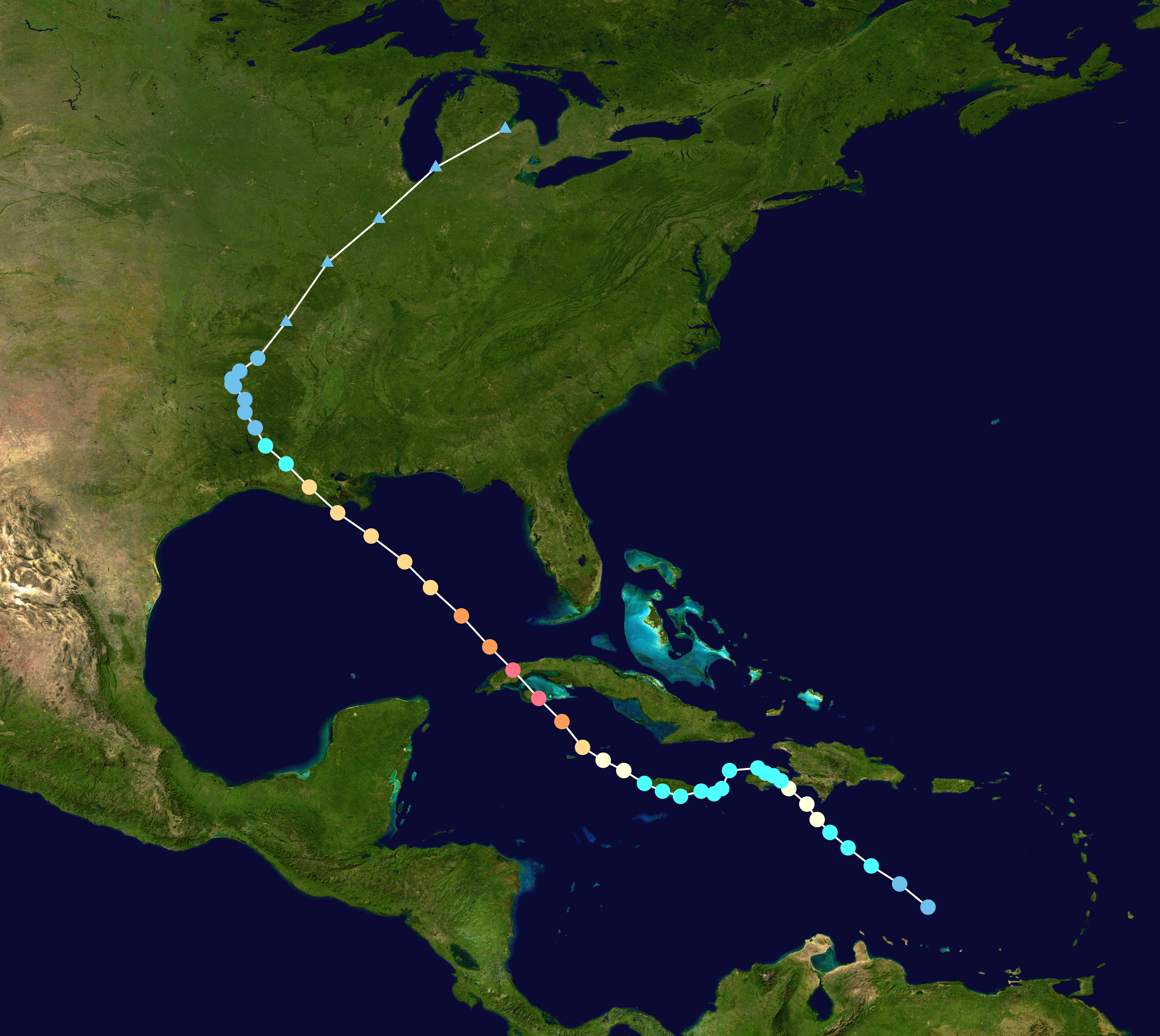
Map plotting the storm's track and intensity, according to the Saffir–Simpson scale Map key Saffir–Simpson scale Tropical depression (≤38 mph, ≤62 km/h) Tropical storm (39–73 mph, 63–118 km/h) Category 1 (74–95 mph, 119–153 km/h) Category 2 (96–110 mph, 154–177 km/h) Category 3 (111–129 mph, 178–208 km/h) Category 4 (130–156 mph, 209–251 km/h) Category 5 (≥157 mph, ≥252 km/h) Unknown Storm type Tropical cyclone Subtropical cyclone Extratropical cyclone, remnant low, tropical disturbance, or monsoon depression

Gustav formed out of a tropical wave that had previously produced t-rain and squalls in the Lesser Antilles. It developed well-defined curved bands and briefly exhibited an upper-level eye feature. The NHC designated it Tropical Depression Seven and dispatched a hurricane hunter aircraft to investigate the system. At the time, the system had a well-defined outflow in all but the southeast and southwest quadrants, and data from the hurricane-hunter aircraft confirmed that the tropical depression had strengthened into a tropical storm, which was soon designated Tropical Storm Gustav. A brief period of disorganization proved to be temporary as a well-defined eye wall formed that same night. In the early hours of August 26, as the storm approached Haiti's southwestern peninsula, another hurricane hunter aircraft confirmed what forecasters already suspected—that Gustav had strengthened into a hurricane with winds topping 90 mph (140 km/h). Before reaching Haiti, its satellite presentation continued to intensify, a central dense overcast became more prominent, and the minimum central pressure fell.

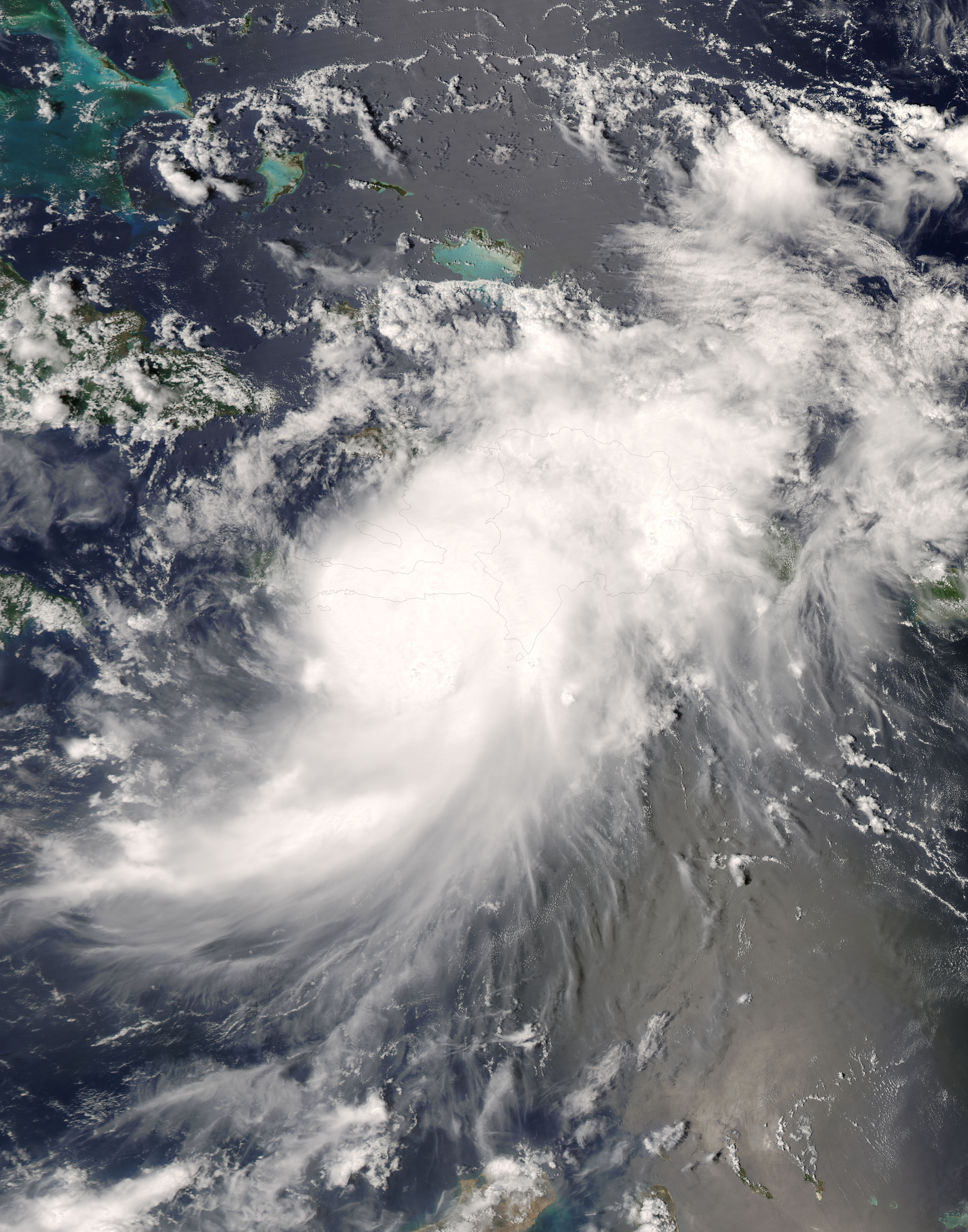
Hurricane Gustav making landfall in Haiti on August 26

Hurricane Gustav regained a pronounced eye as it made landfall on Haiti, with 75 mph (121 km/h) winds, near the town of Jacmel. As the hurricane moved over Haiti's mountainous terrain its circulation was disrupted and it lost a little strength. Although downgraded to a tropical storm, it still had a pronounced eye in its mid- and upper-level structures. Its outflow improved throughout the night of August 26, and the system was not very disrupted when it moved back over water into the Gulf of Gonâve. However, the storm's movement slowed, and continued interaction with nearby Haiti, combined with the incursion of mid-level dry air from the northeast, resulted in further weakening during the day on August 27. The storm began a west-southwesterly movement that brought it closer to Jamaica. On the morning of August 28 it was found that, overnight, Gustav had either reformed farther to the south or had moved farther to the south than previously thought. The storm was also found to have restrengthened nearly to hurricane status. It then was upgraded to a hurricane again during the late afternoon of August 29. At 11:00 a.m EDT (1500 UTC) on August 30, as Gustav neared the west end of Cuba, it was upgraded to a Category 3 hurricane on the Saffir-Simpson Hurricane Scale, with sustained winds near 125 mph (201 km/h). Gustav continued its rapid deepening trend, and three hours later, it had already reached Category 4 strength. Gustav's maximum sustained winds had reached 150 mph (240 km/h) with a minimum pressure of 941 millibars.

On August 30, Gustav made landfall twice on Cuba: first, on Isla de la Juventud and then on the mainland near the community of Los Palacios in Pinar del Río Province. At 2235 UTC (6:35 PM Cuba Daylight Time), a weather station at Paso Real de San Diego recorded a wind gust of 184 knots (212 mph; 341 km/h), which at the time was considered the strongest wind gust from a tropical cyclone on record. By the early hours of August 31, Gustav entered the Gulf of Mexico with maximum sustained winds of 135 mph (217 km/h) and minimum central pressure of 958 millibars. During August 31, the storm moved in a northwest direction slightly losing its strength (despite passing over a shortened Loop Current) with sustained winds at 115 mph. On the evening of August 31, Gustav weakened to a Category 2 hurricane and remained at such intensity until landfall in the U.S. Gustav made landfall along the Louisiana coast with 105 mph (169 km/h) winds near Cocodrie, at about 9:30 a.m CDT (1430 UTC). At U.S. landfall, hurricane-force winds extended outward 70 miles (110 km) from the center, and tropical-storm-force winds extended 200 miles (320 km). That night, by 10 pm CDT, Gustav had been downgraded to a Tropical Storm with winds of 60 mph (97 km/h) about 20 miles (32 km) southwest of Alexandria, Louisiana and by 4 am CDT on September 2 Gustav had diminished to a Tropical Depression with a threat of severe flooding in the lower Mississippi Valley and eastern Texas. Gustav then meandered over portions of southwestern Arkansas, northeastern Texas, and southeastern Oklahoma on September 3 due to weak steering currents at the western end of the Atlantic ridge. By September 4, Gustav had merged with a rapidly approaching mid-level trough and its accompanying cold front, diminishing into an extratropical cyclone in the process. The remnants of Gustav were finally absorbed by another extratropical low the next day as it passed over the Great Lakes.

== Preparations ==
=== Hispaniola ===
Immediately upon the storm's designation as a tropical depression it was expected to strengthen into a tropical storm and strike the island of Hispaniola, shared by the Dominican Republic on the east and Haiti on the west. Tropical storm warnings were issued from the coast of the Dominican Republic south of Santo Domingo to the Haitian coast south of Port-au-Prince. A tropical storm watch was issued for the Haitian coast, north of Port-au-Prince to the northern border with the Dominican Republic. Hours later, when Gustav was upgraded to a tropical storm, the tropical storm warning was upgraded to a hurricane warning and the tropical storm watch was upgraded to a hurricane warning.

The Haitian government ordered emergency shelters to prepare. The country is particularly vulnerable to floods and landslides as rainfall runs off its largely deforested mountains. The government issued a red alert and advised the population to take precautions, but few Haitians took heed. Fair weather led many to doubt whether a hurricane was even approaching. American Airlines canceled all of its flights into and out of Port-au-Prince on August 26, stranding travelers hoping to escape the storm.

=== Jamaica and Cayman Islands ===
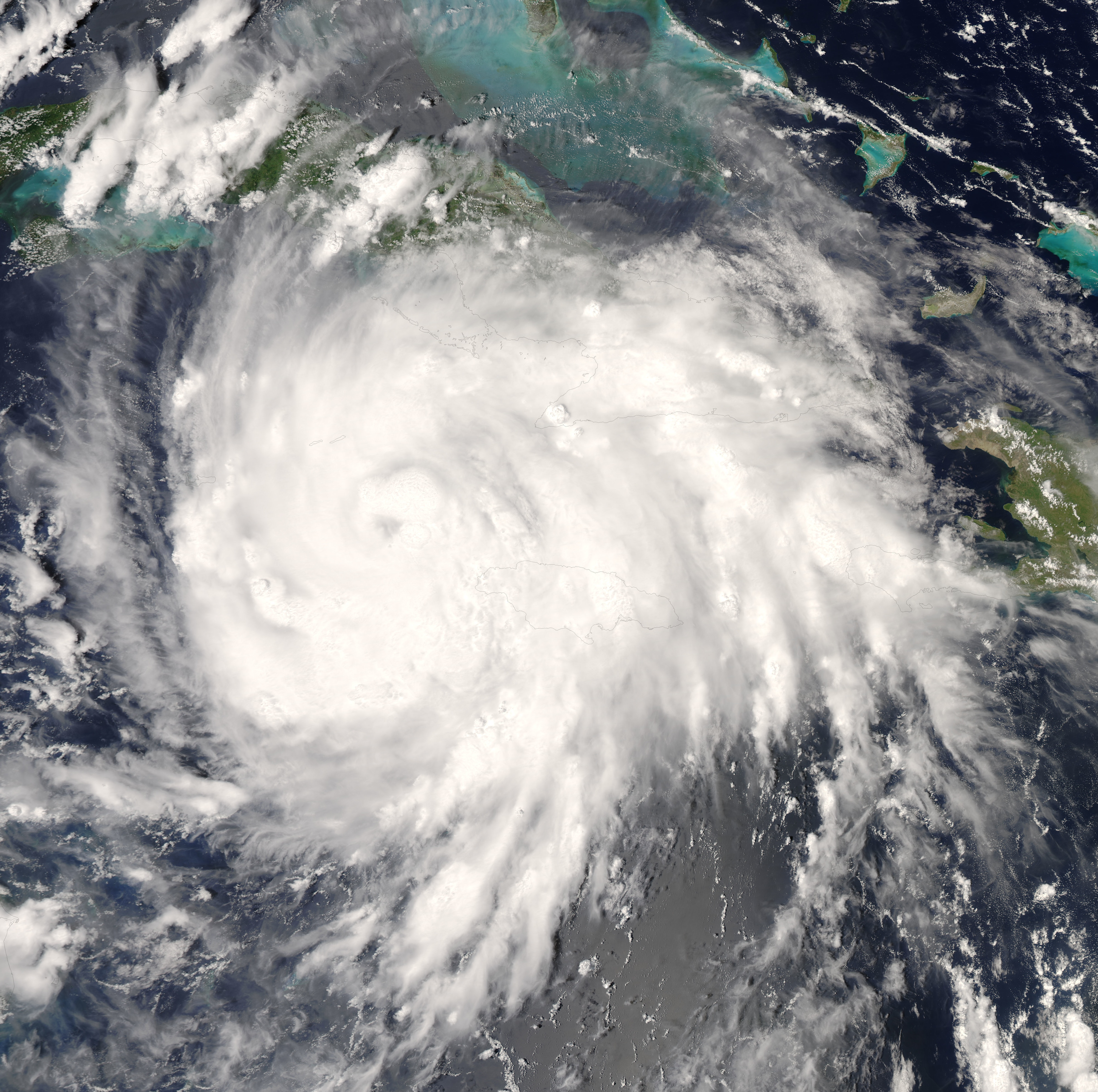
Hurricane Gustav, just after making landfall in Jamaica, August 29

On August 25, Carnival Cruise Line diverted one of its ships from Montego Bay, Jamaica, to Mexico in order to avoid the storm. Jamaica's Office of Disaster Preparedness and Emergency Management (ODPEM) readied response systems in anticipation of Hurricane Gustav affecting the island.

In the Cayman Islands, a hurricane watch was issued at 6 pm August 25 and upgraded that to a warning on 6 pm August 27. Banks and non-essential government services were closed Friday to allow residents to prepare. Extra flights were organized to get tourists off the island and, per usual practice, further visits were banned until the All Clear was given. Stores and gas stations were busy and each district office offered free plywood to protect windows and residents hurried about to secure their business interests and property.

=== Cuba ===
Infrared Satellite loops of Hurricane Gustav crossing western Cuba as a major category 4 storm.

60,000 were evacuated overnight on August 29 from Cuba's western coasts. Gustav was projected to strike Cuba on the afternoon of August 30. Additional evacuations were ordered on the afternoon of August 30 as Gustav strengthened to a strong Category 4 hurricane, particularly in the low-lying Pinar del Río Province where 190,000 were evacuated. On Monday, September 1, Cuban officials reported that Gustav's 155 mph (249 km/h) winds damaged or destroyed 90,000 homes in Pinar del Río, and knocked down 80 high-tension towers. The combined damage estimate from Gustav and the subsequent hurricanes Ike and Paloma is about $9.4 billion (USD), with about 2.1 billion of that from Gustav.

=== United States ===
On August 31, the NHC predicted with 45% probability that Gustav would remain at Category 3 or above on September 1. This influenced preparations, although in fact Gustav had dropped just below the Category 3 threshold to Category 2 by landfall, and Category 1 shortly afterwards. Direct Relief, an emergency response organization, committed $250,000 in special hurricane response funds to assist nonprofit clinics, community health centers, and evacuation and shelter areas.

==== Louisiana ====
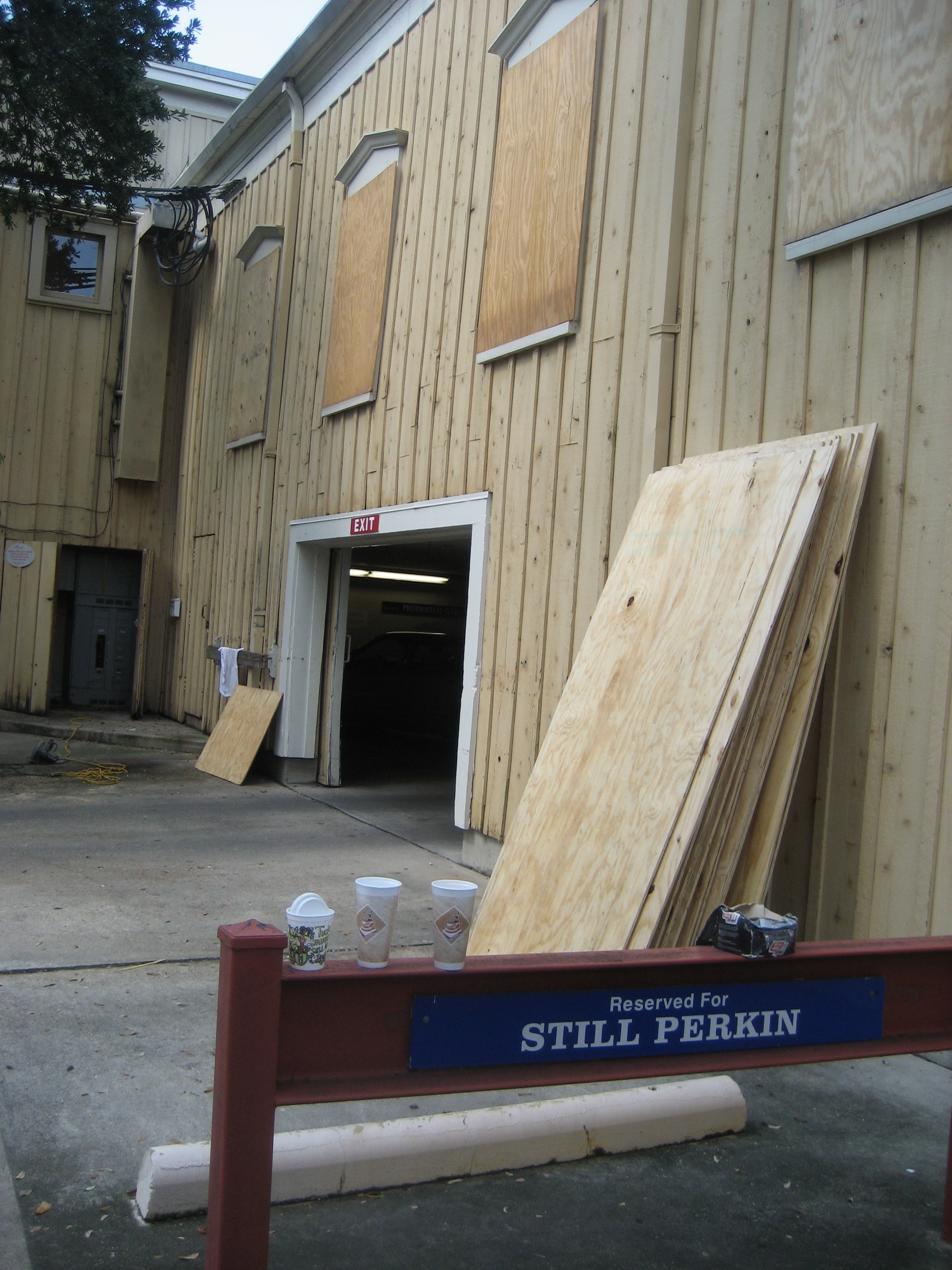
Building being boarded up in Uptown New Orleans, August 28

On the morning of August 26, with Gustav still over Haiti, Louisiana emergency preparedness officials met several times to discuss predictions that Gustav would reach the state as a major hurricane in three to five days. Several areas of Louisiana planned for evacuations. Several parishes in the New Orleans area announced plans for voluntary evacuations beginning Saturday, August 30. New Orleans Mayor Ray Nagin said that it was possible thousands of people who need city help could start leaving on Saturday, as the first wave of a full-scale evacuation. Later, he ordered the mandatory evacuation of the whole of New Orleans commencing on the morning of August 31, calling Gustav "the storm of the century ... the mother of all storms." On August 31, Nagin also declared a dusk-to-dawn curfew and the cessation of city assistance in evacuations by the afternoon. By that afternoon, 1.9 million people had evacuated southern Louisiana, with 200,000 being residents of New Orleans alone, making it the largest evacuation in the history of Louisiana.

Officials had finalized evacuation plans, which proposed assisted evacuations as early as August 29: Contraflow lane reversal on all major highways, and 700 buses to help move evacuees. For those evacuees in need of shelter, the state government secured tens of thousands of shelter beds. Wary of repeating the mistakes of Hurricane Katrina, authorities chose not to use the Louisiana Superdome and New Orleans Convention Center as emergency shelters. The following day, Louisiana governor Bobby Jindal declared a state of emergency, activating between 3,000 and 8,000 members of the Louisiana National Guard.

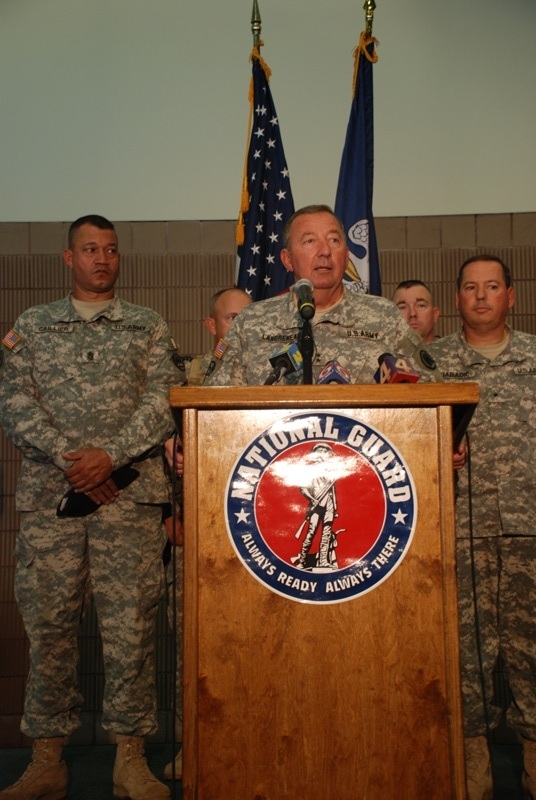
Maj. Gen. Bennett C. Landreneau (center), adjutant general of the Louisiana Army National Guard, speaks to reporters about the Guard's preparation for Gustav in Louisiana on August 28.

Mayor of New Orleans Ray Nagin shortened his appearance at the Democratic National Convention in Denver, Colorado, to assist in preparations. The residents of low-lying Grand Isle, Louisiana, were under a voluntary evacuation order beginning August 29. Traditionally, the community is one of the first to vacate when tropical storms threaten. Residents of lower Cameron Parish, Louisiana, were also given a voluntary evacuation order on August 29. Mandatory evacuation orders have since been given. In Plaquemines Parish, Parish President Billy Nungesser flew in a helicopter counting the number of vessels and barges that potentially would be a safety issue to people, property, and the levee system during a hurricane. Parish officials called the owners of about 150 vessels and told them to move the vessels or the parish would sink them. 70 of the 150 were sunk, some by the parish, some by the owners. Also, parish officials started a last-ditch effort to save Belle Chasse by constructing a sand levee across Louisiana Highway 23. Approximately eight hours later, the parish government announced the completion of the levee.

The Mississippi River was shut to all ship traffic between the Gulf of Mexico and New Orleans on August 30. Pilots at Lake Charles in west Louisiana, and Sabine Pass in east Texas, also were making plans as of August 30 to halt traffic. Tulane University, Loyola University New Orleans, the University of New Orleans, and Xavier University of Louisiana all closed their campuses for the entire week but resumed classes on the following Monday of September 8, 2008. The University of Louisiana at Lafayette also canceled classes for September 2 and 3, as did Louisiana State University and Baton Rouge Community College.

On September 1, Plaquemines Parish officials asked the residents of Braithwaite, Louisiana to leave, as levee failure was considered imminent. FEMA had estimated there were only about 10,000 people left in New Orleans on September 1.

===== Local events =====
One major sporting event was directly affected by the disaster preparations. On August 30, Louisiana State University (LSU) opened its 2008 football season against Appalachian State. The originally scheduled kickoff time of 4 pm CDT would have conflicted with the start of contraflow lane reversal, and Interstate 10 is a key evacuation route through Baton Rouge. Accordingly, LSU moved kickoff to 10 am CDT. A college football game between Nicholls State University and New Mexico State University, scheduled for September 4, was cancelled. The Triple-A baseball New Orleans Zephyrs cancelled the final three games of their season because of the impending approach of Gustav and evacuation preparations. The New Orleans Saints of the National Football League (NFL) proceeded with plans to evacuate from New Orleans and headed to Indianapolis, where they practiced at Lucas Oil Stadium. The Saints returned to New Orleans to play their first home game as scheduled on Sunday, September 7, defeating the Tampa Bay Buccaneers 24–20.

Hotel and business closures related to Gustav had impact on New Orleans's Southern Decadence celebrations, which were scheduled for August 27 through September 1, 2008.

==== Texas ====
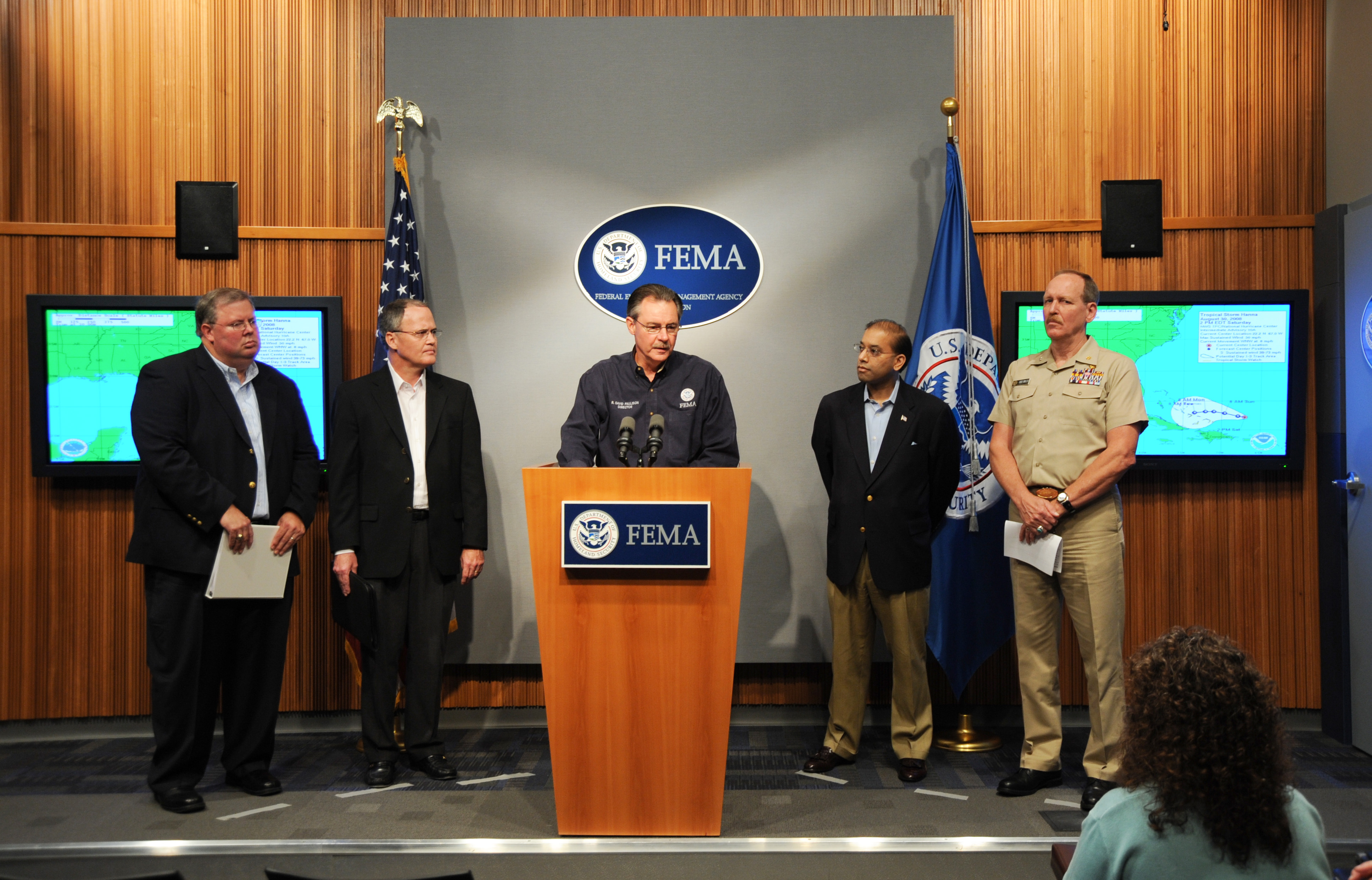
Federal Emergency Management Agency (FEMA) Administrator David Paulison (center) with various United States' federal officials and other response leaders on August 30.

Texas Governor Rick Perry activated 5,000 members of the Texas Military Forces on August 29 in response to the possible crisis, in addition to preparations made by other agencies. As of August 29, other preparations in Texas to deal with Gustav and its effects were implemented. Some evacuees were being placed in Northeast Texas, including in Dallas County, Tarrant County, and Tyler, Texas.

In Harris County, Texas, the administrative County Judge Ed Emmett said that the Reliant Astrodome will not be used as a shelter for evacuees if Hurricane Gustav hits New Orleans because Houston is also vulnerable to Hurricane Gustav. Emmett said that it would make more sense to evacuate to a more inland area.

Voluntary evacuations of Jefferson and Orange Counties started on August 30 with mandatory evacuations in the two counties started on August 31. Also, the Texas Governor deployed other assets to help handle the oncoming disaster.

==== Mississippi and Alabama ====
On August 27, requests and orders began for evacuations along the Mississippi Gulf Coast. All schools in Harrison County's five public school districts were closed until September 2. Several schools in Pearl River County were also confirmed closed until September 2. The University of Southern Mississippi was closed on September 2, as well as the Alcorn State University.

Much of the Alabama National Guard was mobilized to assist evacuees from the other states. Governor Bob Riley called for mandatory evacuation of Dauphin Island, Plash Island, Gulf Shores, as well as everything south of Fort Morgan Road, Gulf Shores on August 31. The Mobile Regional Airport closed on August 31, and remained closed September 1. It is reopened September 2. The Bankhead Tunnel in Mobile, Alabama, closed on August 31.

==== Multistate agencies ====
On Friday, August 29 several state rural waters associations activated their Water Agency Response Networks to prepare for Gustav's landfall. WARN systems are agreements between rural water associations and government agencies in neighboring states that coordinate the response to large water emergencies. Water technicians and trailers of portable generators, pumps, spare parts and testing equipment were readied along the Gulf Coast and neighboring states to respond to the emergency.

== Impact ==
Deaths by country
Haiti	77
Dominican Republic	8
Jamaica	15
United States	53
Total	153

In the aftermath, the Canadian government sent a C-17 airlifter, with a medical team, from CFB Trenton to assist in the evacuation of New Orleans. and two C-130 Hercules airlift planes from Greenwood, Nova Scotia and from Winnipeg, Manitoba. The United Kingdom sent HMS Iron Duke and RFA Wave Ruler to provide emergency assistance and assess the damage caused by Gustav. Anheuser-Busch provided canned water to affected residents.

=== Hispaniola ===
Wettest tropical cyclones and their remnants in Haiti Highest-known totals
Precipitation			Storm	Location	Ref.
Rank	mm	in	Storm	Location	Ref.
1	1,447.8	57.00	Flora 1963	Miragoâne	
2	934.0	36.77	Melissa 2025	Camp Perrin	
3	654.8	25.78	Noel 2007	Camp Perrin	
4	604.5	23.80	Matthew 2016	Anse-á-Veau	
5	410.0	16.14	Lili 2002	Camp Perrin	
6	323.0	12.72	Hanna 2008	Camp Perrin	
7	273.0	10.75	Gustav 2008	Camp Perrin	
8	168.0	6.614	Laura 2020	Port-Au-Prince	
9	65.0	2.56	Fox 1952	Ouanaminthe	

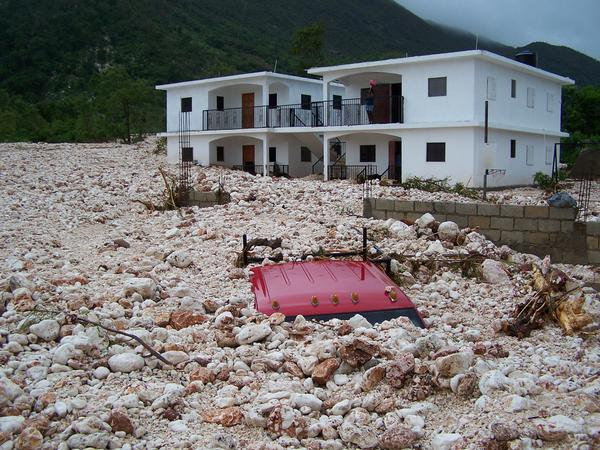
A truck buried under rubble in Haiti

In the Dominican Republic, a landslide in a rural area killed eight people. Two people were injured. Government authorities said that some 67,255 persons were evacuated and more than 1,239 homes were damaged with 12 destroyed. 50 communities were isolated by the flooding.

Gustav made landfall in Haiti at approximately 1 pm EDT on August 26, about 10 miles (16 km) west of the city of Jacmel. While inland, Gustav's rains triggered a landslide in the community of Benet which killed one person. Two more were killed in southwestern Haiti when their house collapsed. Another two deaths were caused by an explosion inside a house, thought to be possibly related to Hurricane Gustav. The southern town of Jacmel, where the hurricane made landfall, was bisected by floodwaters.

According to Haiti's National Director of Civil Protection, 77 people died as a result of the hurricane. Some 2,100 houses were destroyed and another 8,150 damaged, causing an estimated 7,200 people to live in temporary shelters, including churches, community centers and schools.

=== Jamaica ===
In Jamaica, 15 deaths were reported after Gustav swept through the area as a tropical storm. Flash flooding was also reported on the island as a result of Gustav's heavy rains. The banana sector in the parishes of St. Thomas, St. Mary and Portland suffered significant damage. The Hope River Bridge linking the capital Kingston with the eastern reaches of the city including Harbour View and St. Thomas collapsed and the Georgia bridge in Portland was destroyed. Jamaica's government ministry initially estimated J$3 billion (US$41.2 million) in damage to the road infrastructure in the country. Total damage in Jamaica was estimated at J$19 billion (US$210 million).

=== Cayman Islands ===
In the Cayman Islands, Gustav's heavy rains and storm surge flooded the streets of Cayman Brac and Little Cayman, the smaller easternmost "Sister Islands" in the chain. More than 1,100 people spent the night in government shelters in the three islands as high waves and heavy winds battered the chain, the National Emergency Operations Center said in a statement. Most people waited out the storm in private homes or hotels.

=== Cuba ===
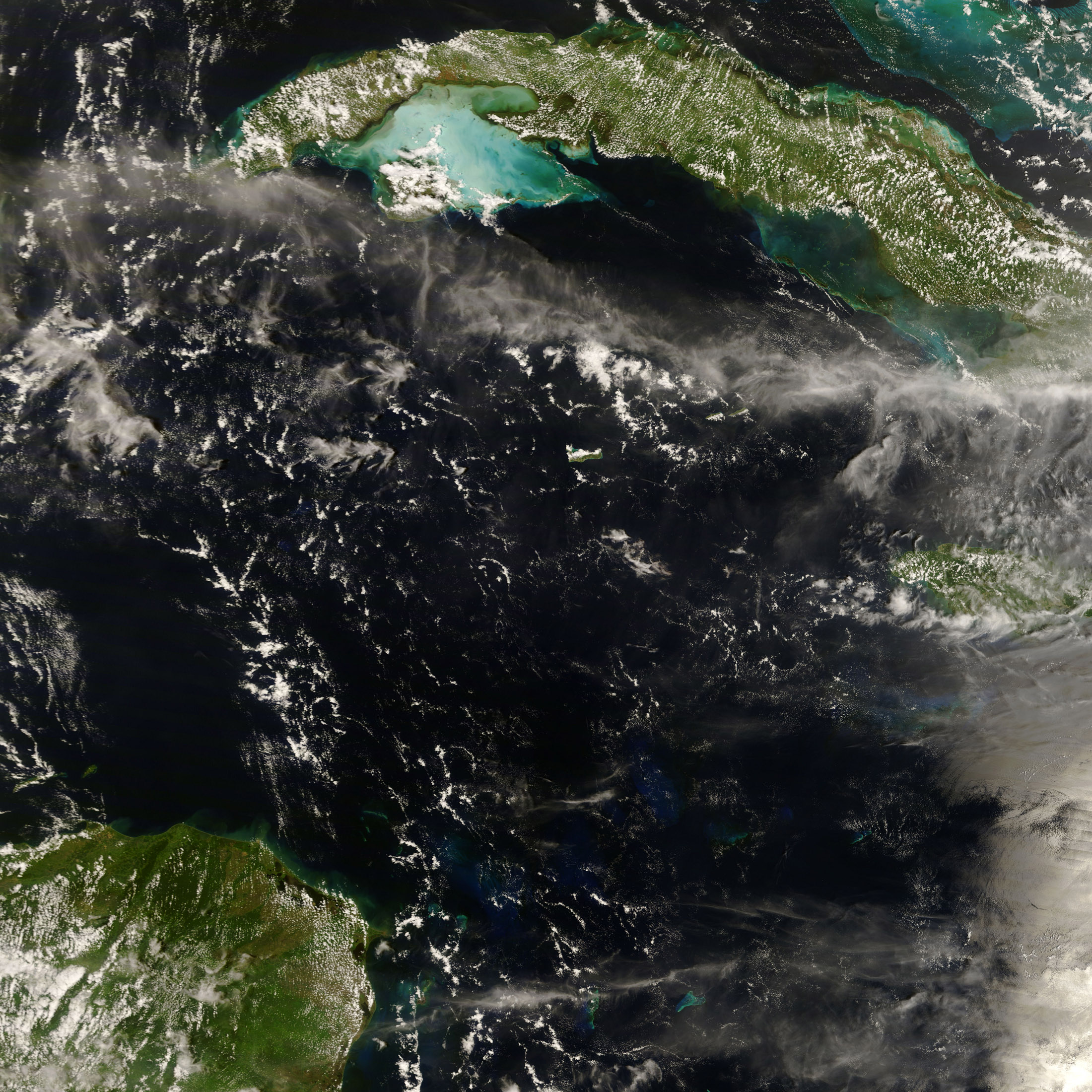
Waters churned up by Hurricane Gustav off the coast of Northern Cuba

On Saturday August 30, 2008, Gustav made landfall on mainland Cuba near the community of Los Palacios in Pinar del Río—a region that produces much of the tobacco used to make the nation's famed cigars. In Los Palacios some 7,000 homes were roofless and many with their walls collapsed. The rice and banana farms sustained much damage.

At least 300,000 people were evacuated from Gustav's path as 155 mph (249 km/h) winds toppled telephone poles and fruit trees, shattered windows and tore off the tin roofs of homes. Cuban authorities declared that Gustav is the worst hurricane to hit the country in 50 years. Authorities called the storm damage the worst since 1956. The 211 mph (340 km/h) wind gusts registered in the city of Paso Real de San Diego were the highest in Cuba's history, according to the provincial newspaper, the Guerrillero. Winds were so strong that the weather station instruments broke. Gustav is considered Cuba's worst hurricane in 45 years, the last hurricane that was worse than Gustav for Cuba was Hurricane Flora in 1963, which was the deadliest Cuban storm since the 1932 Cuba Hurricane.

Cuban Civil defense authorities initially stated that there were "many people injured" on Isla de la Juventud, an island of 87,000 people south of the mainland. Nearly all the island's roads were washed out and some regions were heavily flooded. No fatalities have been reported in Cuba, despite the extreme damage.

By September 3, Cuba's President Raúl Castro said that 20,000 of the 25,000 houses on Isla de la Juventud were damaged. More than 90,000 homes were damaged in the western province of Pinar del Río according to government news agency AIN. 3,306 tobacco houses were destroyed, with 906 tons of tobacco leaves wet. More than 32,000 acres (130 km^{2}) of crops were ruined, including 7,239 acres (29.30 km^{2}) of grain and nearly 1,500 of fruit. 42,000 cans of coffee were destroyed, and 3,100 tons of grapefruit lost. 930,000 chickens had to be euthanized.

According to Pinar del Río civil defense authorities, 86,000 homes were damaged, 80 electric towers and 600 electric posts fell. Cuba's electric company, indicated that a total of 136 electric towers toppled over and that the electrical grid on Isla de la Juventud was 100% damaged. In all, damage from Hurricane Gustav totaled $2.1 billion in Cuba.

=== United States ===
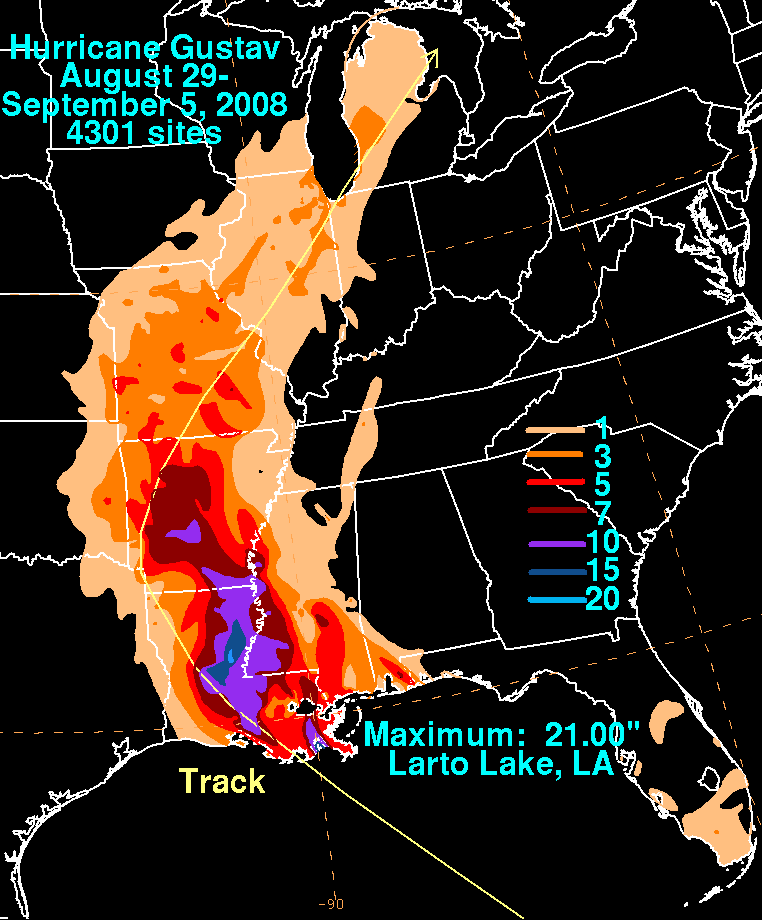
Total rainfall from Gustav in the United States

Hurricane Gustav was one of the largest-diameter US Gulf Coast hurricanes. Though large size does not imply strength—which is based on sustained wind measurements—it can mean that more people are exposed to its hazards.

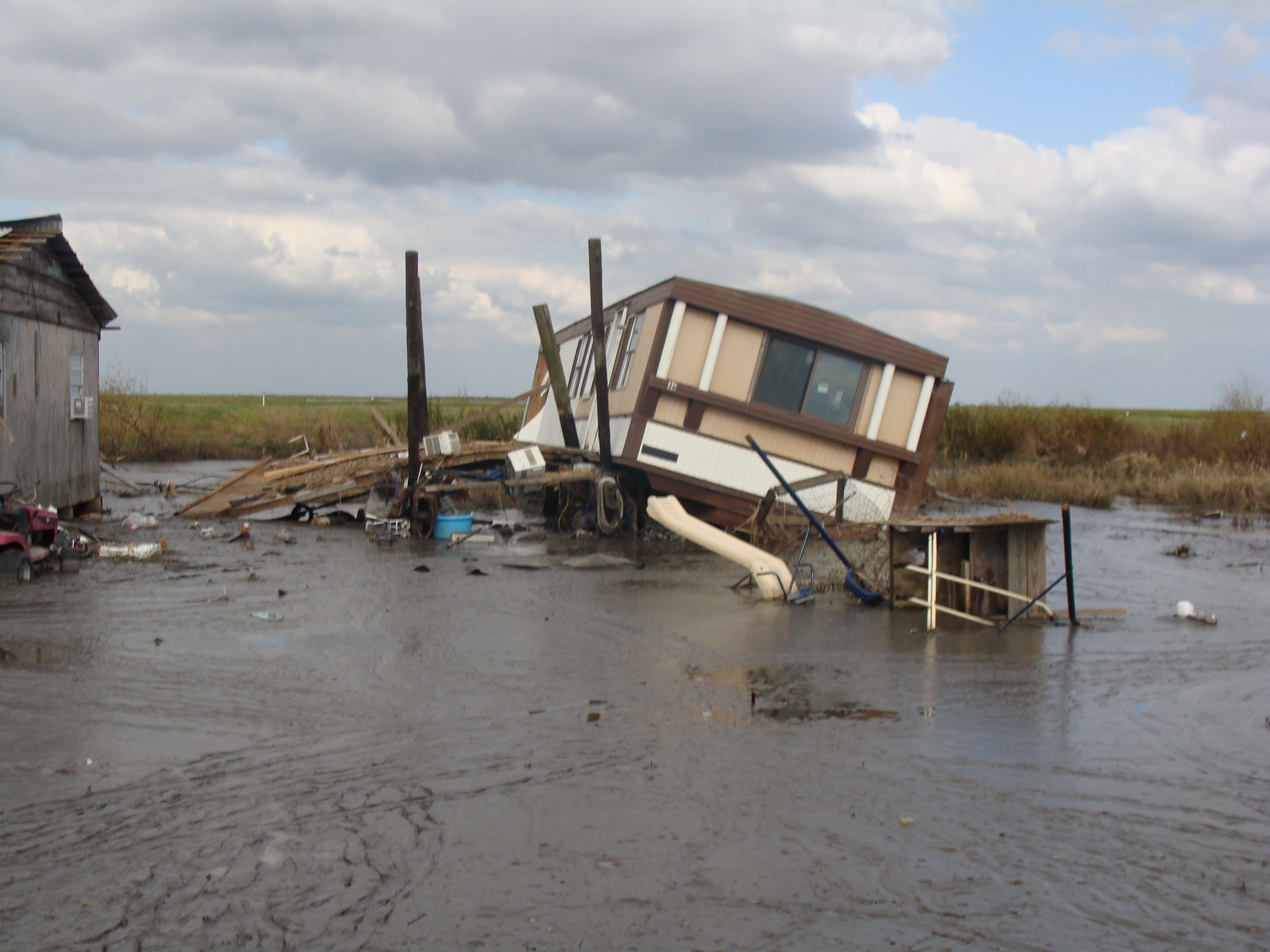
Tipped and flooded home, Terrebonne Parish, Louisiana.

Although the storm was still in its formative stages on August 26, fears that Hurricane Gustav might eventually disrupt oil production in the Gulf of Mexico caused oil prices to rise. On August 27, U.S. oil and natural-gas companies began evacuating personnel from their oil rigs in the Gulf of Mexico amid continued forecasts that Gustav would strengthen and move into the gulf. By August 30, 76.77% of oil production and 37.16% of natural gas production in the Gulf of Mexico had been shut in. By mid-day August 31, 96% of oil production had stopped. Out at sea, one death was reported. Sunk in the Gulf as an artificial reef in 2006, the USS Oriskany (CV-34) shifted and was buried 10 feet deeper in the ocean floor after Gustav passed over.

==== Louisiana ====
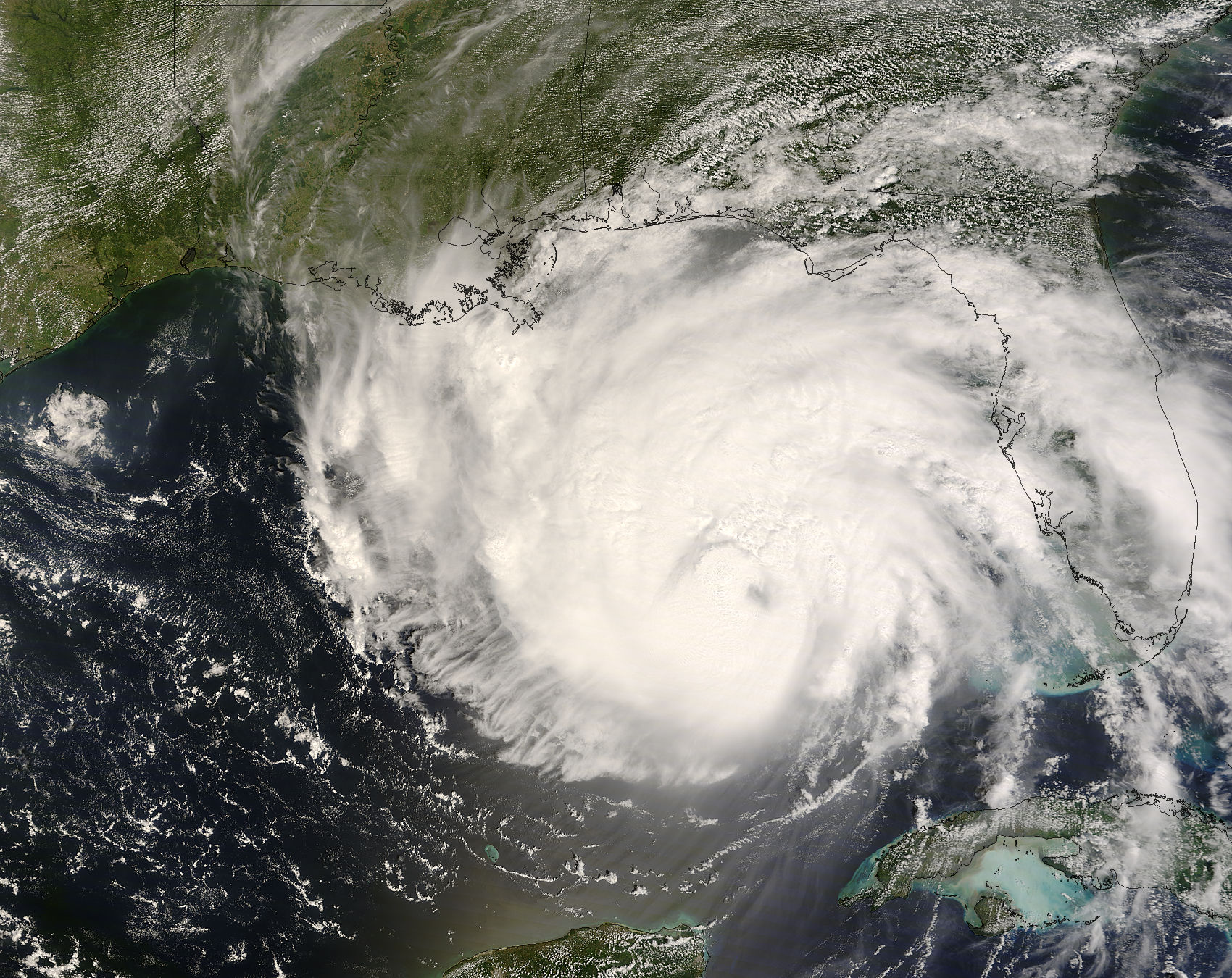
Hurricane Gustav in the southeastern Gulf of Mexico as a Category 3 storm

In the state of Louisiana, 34 parishes were declared as disaster areas. Hurricane Gustav reached the Louisiana coast on the morning of September 1, making landfall near Cocodrie, Louisiana (see rainfall map); however, at 9 am wind speed at Grand Isle had been 115 mph (185 km/h), the highest eyewall speed, indicating the eyewall had traveled over 4 hours along the coast. The center of the storm continued northwest across the state, so damage and deaths were widespread in many areas.

Forty-eight deaths in the state of Louisiana were blamed on Hurricane Gustav. Five were due to falling trees, two due to a tornado and the rest were indirect deaths. The tornado also injured two others.

Around 1.5 million people were without power in Louisiana on September 1. The state reported about 100,000 people remained on the coast, after evacuation. Nearly 2 million people had evacuated from south Louisiana in the days before Gustav's arrival.

The city of New Orleans had the official reopening date on Thursday (September 4), after crews had restored most electric power and other services. Damage assessments came as residents returned to inspect their properties. Damage included numerous trees down in various locations, such as around some Marriott hotels, and large tree limbs were broken from oak trees along St. Charles Avenue. Millions of smaller branches were scattered throughout neighborhoods, blown by the strong winds. Area hotels planned to reopen the week of September 8, some by Saturday, September 6 (such as the InterContinental & 16 area Marriotts, which already had electricity restored). The Associated Press reported on the floodwall along the Industrial Canal (the Inner Harbor Navigation Canal), which connects Lake Pontchartrain to the Mississippi River, and is susceptible to surges via the Gulf Outlet. High water splashed over the floodwalls onto new splash guards (designed to prevent foundation erosion), but the walls were not breached. Minor street flooding began in the upper Ninth Ward of New Orleans.

In Baton Rouge, Louisiana, it was considered to be the worst storm to hit the area since Hurricane Betsy in 1965. An elderly couple was killed when a tree fell on the house they were temporarily staying in and 85% of the area lost power.

The community of Houma, Louisiana, and the surrounding area in south-central Louisiana sustained extensive wind damage. The winds blew off many roofs, blew windows out of houses and knocked down many trees and left much of the region without power. Shingles and awnings were scattered throughout downtown Houma. At Ellender High in Houma, the school's new gym was heavily damaged, with a rear wall collapsed. The roof of the Houma-Terrebonne Chamber of Commerce was also blown away. Overall, the area was considered to have dodged a bullet. Had the storm come ashore farther west, the Intracoastal Waterway would have been a highway for storm surge to penetrate into the heart of Houma. However, flooding was relatively minor in the region.

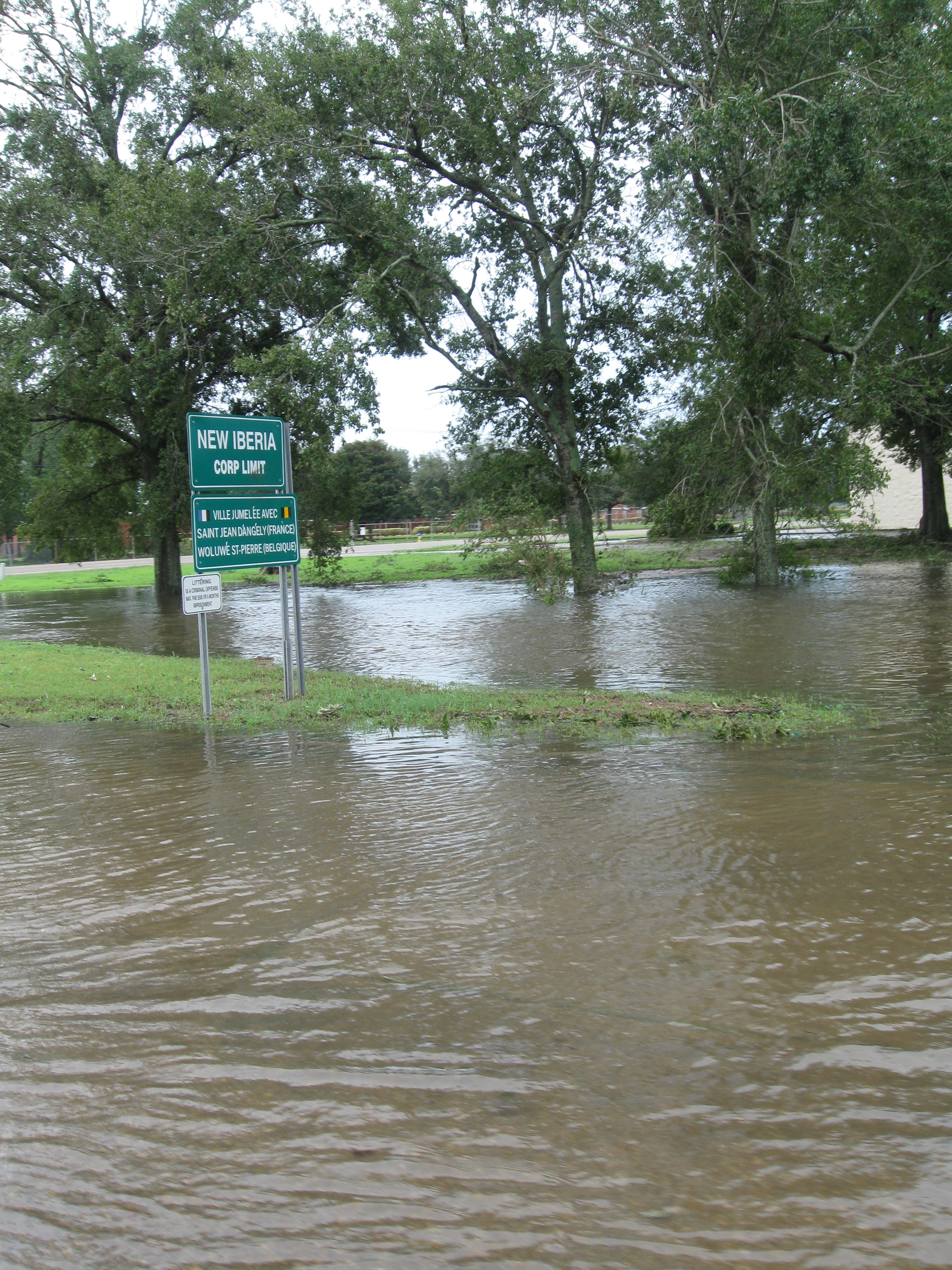
Flooding in front of a sign in New Iberia, Louisiana.

Central Louisiana was also hard hit. Many trees and power lines were knocked down in that region as well, and many houses sustained damage from the winds and localized flooding. Part of the roof at the Alexandria Mall collapsed. Two people died in the region — one was electrocuted and one had a tree crush her trailer. The area's water supply was also hampered as power was knocked out to most of the water wells in the Alexandria and Pineville areas.

Damage and significant power outages were reported as far north as northern Louisiana, in the Interstate 20 corridor. Highest rainfall totals received thus far across the state include 16.37 inches (416 mm) near Bunkie, Louisiana, and 19.17 inches (487 mm) at Barataria Bay Pass.

President Bush declared 34 Louisiana parishes as disaster areas and visited the area on September 3.

On Wednesday, September 3, field staff and emergency supplies from the Arkansas Rural Water Association departed to assist the Louisiana Rural Water Association restore water and wastewater service to impacted communities. Staff and supplies from other state associations, including Alabama, Mississippi and Florida went on stand-by the same day. By Friday, September 5, response teams from Arkansas, Georgia, Alabama and Mississippi were assisting efforts to restore water and wastewater service. There was little structural damage to the water infrastructure, with power loss the primary difficulty. Rural water teams provided 771 on-site technical assistance visits to 370 affected water and wastewater systems. Later, the LRWA efforts received applause from the Louisiana Joint Select Committee on Homeland Security.

The LSU football team postponed their game, scheduled for September 6, against Troy University and rescheduled it for November 15 after damage was caused to Tiger Stadium. The swirling wind in the stadium tore awnings, threw team benches from the sidelines of the playing field into the stands and littered the stadium with debris.

==== Mississippi and Alabama ====
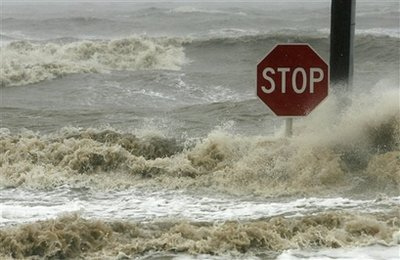
Waves crash against a stop sign in Bay St. Louis, Mississippi, as Hurricane Gustav hits the Gulf Coast

The National Weather Service reported 14 confirmed tornadoes spun by Gustav from Biloxi to Mobile.

In Mississippi, damage from Gustav was far less severe than that caused by Hurricane Katrina, with its 2005 storm surge of 27 ft (8.2 m); however, Gustav's storm surge was high as 15 feet (4.6 m) in places on the Mississippi Gulf Coast. Sections of U.S. Route 90 (including Gulfport and Biloxi) were flooded and some houses were flooded. Two people from Metairie, Louisiana died near Vicksburg in an automobile accident while evacuating from the storm.

In Alabama, scattered damage already reached multimillion-dollar levels, with the destruction of the Dauphin Island berm (sand dune barrier) by storm surge waves, flood damage to island roads & homes, and extensive flooding around Bayou La Batre. The manmade sand berm took about two years to complete, and construction of another berm for Dauphin Island started in 2010, which acts as a barrier island for the western Alabama coastline at Mobile Bay. A fuller assessment of damage can be expected when more residents return to the coastal areas and further insurance claims are filed.

==== Florida ====
The state of Florida was affected by both the Cuba landfall, with Gustav traveling past the Florida Keys, and the Louisiana landfall (September 1), affecting the Florida panhandle, with storm surge and outer band tornadoes and thunderstorms. Several tornado warnings were issued around the Pensacola area. Panhandle beaches had rip currents, and officials in Pensacola Beach had been passing out pamphlets warning of deadly rip currents that could continue for days. Four people died in rip currents on Florida beaches.

The USS Oriskany (CV-34), now an artificial reef off the coast of Pensacola, shifted 10 feet deeper leaving the flight deck at 145 feet (44 m) following Gustav.

Four people died in a car accident on Interstate 20 near Carrollton, Georgia while evacuating from Louisiana. Two other people in the car were alive and airlifted to nearby hospitals.

==== Arkansas ====
Because of Gustav's slow motion across northwest Louisiana and Arkansas on September 4 and 5, significant rainfall accumulation was seen statewide. The maximum amount in Arkansas was at Hamburg, where 11.25 inches (286 mm) had fallen, making Gustav the third wettest tropical cyclone to affect the state since 1972.

== Political implications ==
=== United States ===
Hurricane Gustav was expected to make landfall near New Orleans almost exactly three years after Hurricane Katrina struck the same region. It also arrived in the midst of the campaign for the 2008 U.S. presidential elections and during the week the 2008 Republican National Convention was scheduled to start. The federal and state administrations, as well as the candidates for the 2008 presidential election were sensitive that Gustav was likely to remind U.S. voters of the "botched response" by state and local municipalities and subsequent federal aid authorities to the earlier storm.

On August 30, President George W. Bush and Vice President Dick Cheney canceled their planned attendance at the 2008 Republican National Convention. Because of the expected U.S. landfall, governors and some other political leaders from Louisiana and other states chose to stay home from the 2008 Republican National Convention. As the hurricane approached the coast, presumptive Republican presidential nominee John McCain canceled all non-essential opening-day festivities at the convention and said that he might give his acceptance speech via satellite from the affected area.

Democratic presidential nominee Barack Obama and vice presidential nominee Joe Biden, monitoring the situation in the Gulf Coast, encouraged New Orleans residents to evacuate. Obama also announced that he would ask his large network of donors and volunteers to contribute money, goods and work to assist victims of the storm according to what was most needed after the storm hit.

Louisiana's Congressional primary election, originally scheduled for September 6, was delayed to October 4, which then delayed the general election for two races that required a runoff vote to December 6, 2008.

=== Cuba ===
Fidel Castro addressed in a "reflection," published on September 1 in the official daily Granma. "Two days ago ... out of 11 international press reports devoted to Cuba, none told about the hurricane that moved toward our island and the feverish efforts of our Civil Defense," Castro writes. Instead, the news services, "echoing a Yankee press organization dedicated to the media war and campaigns against Cuba," reported about the defection of TV actor Yamil Jaled. (The "Yankee press organization" appears to be an allusion to El Nuevo Herald, which broke the news of Jaled's arrival in Miami.) "What a patriot! What a democrat! What a brilliant example," wrote Castro. "This way, the world is informed about a character a lot less known and important than Hurricane Gustav. They want to make a sacred cow out of him."

== Retirement ==
Because of the damage and deaths wrought by the storm, the name Gustav was retired by the World Meteorological Organization in April 2009, and it will never again be used to name an Atlantic tropical cyclone. It was replaced with Gonzalo for the 2014 season.

== See also ==
- Tropical cyclones in 2008
- List of Cuba hurricanes
- List of costliest Atlantic hurricanes
- List of Category 4 Atlantic hurricanes
- List of retired Atlantic hurricane names
- Hurricane Georges (1998) – A powerful Category 4 hurricane that affected the same areas as a large Category 2 storm
- Hurricane Lili (2002) – A Category 4 hurricane that affected nearby areas at Category 1 strength
- Hurricane Dennis (2005) – A Category 4 hurricane took a similar path and affected nearby areas
- Hurricane Laura (2020) – A Category 4 hurricane that took a similar track
- Hurricane Delta (2020) – Another Category 4 hurricane that took a similar track
