= WSJC =

Radio station in Magee, Mississippi

- Magee, Mississippi; United States
- Broadcast area: Jackson, Mississippi
- Frequency: 810 kHz

Programming
- Format: Religious

Ownership
- Owner: Family Talk Radio

History
- First air date: July 5, 1957
- Call sign meaning: We Share Jesus Christ

Technical information
- Licensing authority: FCC
- Facility ID: 74003
- Class: B
- Power: 50,000 watts (day); 500 watts (night)
- Transmitter coordinates: 31°52′00.60″N 89°41′35.30″W
- Translator: 95.9 W240EJ (Jackson)

Links
- Public license information: Public file; LMS
- Website: wsjcradio.com

WSJC (810 AM) is a radio station licensed to serve Magee, Mississippi. The station is owned by Family Talk Radio. It airs a Religious radio format.

The station has been assigned these call letters by the Federal Communications Commission since it was initially licensed.
