= Kris Mangum =

American football player and coach (born 1973)

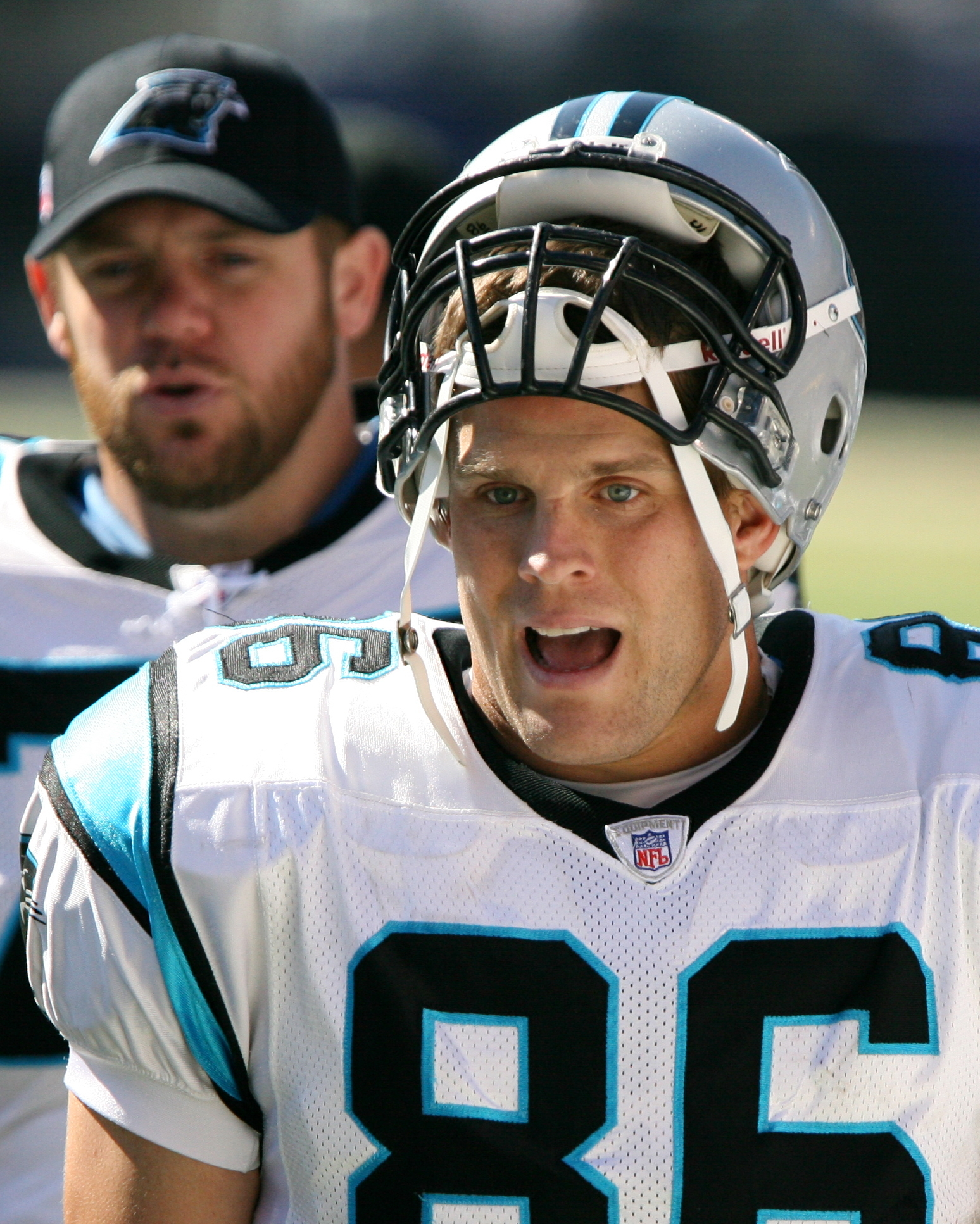
- Mangum with the Carolina Panthers in 2006

No. 86
- Position: Tight end

Personal information
- Born: August 15, 1973 (age 53); Magee, Mississippi, U.S.
- Listed height: 6 ft 4 in (1.93 m)
- Listed weight: 252 lb (114 kg)

Career information
- High school: Magee (MS)
- College: Alabama; Mississippi
- NFL draft: 1997: 7th round, 228th overall pick

Career history

Playing
- Carolina Panthers (1997–2006)

Coaching
- Southern Miss (TE) (2008)

Awards and highlights
- NCAA Division I-A national champion (1992); First-team All-SEC (1995); Second-team All-SEC (1996)

Career NFL statistics
- Receptions: 151
- Receiving yards: 1,424
- Receiving touchdowns: 9
- Stats at Pro Football Reference

Kris Thomas Mangum (born August 15, 1973) is an American former professional football player who played tight end for the Carolina Panthers of the National Football League (NFL) throughout his entire NFL career. He played college football for the Alabama Crimson Tide and the Ole Miss Rebels and was selected by the Panthers in the 7th round of the 1997 NFL draft. His father, John Mangum Sr. and his brother, John Mangum Jr. are both former NFL players.

== Early life ==
Kris Thomas Mangum was born on August 15, 1973, in Magee, Mississippi. He is the son of John Mangum Sr. (1942–1994), who is best known as the defensive tackle for the Boston Patriots from 1966 to 1967. Kris is also the brother of John Mangum Jr., a former NFL player better known as the defensive back for the Chicago Bears from 1990 to 1998.

At Magee High School of Magee, Mississippi, Mangum caught 36 passes for 640 yards and eight touchdowns and added 113 tackles, four sacks, two interceptions and two fumble recoveries as a senior.

== College career ==
Mangum graduated from high school in 1992 and first enrolled at the University of Alabama. In his freshman year at Alabama, Mangum played in eight games mostly on special teams for the Crimson Tide football team. Mangum was part of the 1993 Sugar Bowl and national champion Alabama team of 1992. In 1993, Mangum transferred to the University of Mississippi and sat out the season for the Ole Miss Rebels. He ended his college football career ranked 14th all-time in receptions at Ole Miss, collecting 74 catches for 729 yards during three seasons. As a junior in 1995, he was a first-team All-Southeastern Conference selection, while making nine starts. In his senior season of 1996, Mangum made 29 receptions for 264 yards and 2 touchdowns and was a first-team All-SEC selection. Mangum led the SEC with 36 catches for 391 yards and two touchdowns, the most receptions by a Rebels tight end since Wesley Walls established the mark in 1988. Mangum graduated with a B.A. in public administration from Mississippi in 1996.

In 1996, he was a finalist for the Conerly Trophy.

== Professional career ==
Mangum was drafted in the seventh round of the 1997 NFL draft with the 228th overall pick. Mangum spent his first six years of his NFL career as a backup to former Panther tight end, and fellow Ole Miss alum, Wesley Walls. Upon his retirement, he was currently the longest tenured player on offense for the Panthers. He scored his first NFL touchdown on a 15-yard reception against the Kansas City Chiefs in 2000. Mangum produced career highs of 34 catches, 497 receiving yards and three touchdowns in 2004.

== NFL career statistics ==
Legend
	Led the league
**Bold**	Career high

=== Regular season ===
Year	Team	Games		Receiving				
Year	Team	GP	GS	Rec	Yds	Avg	Lng	TD
1997	CAR	2	1	4	56	**14.0**	22	0
1998	CAR	6	0	1	5	5.0	5	0
1999	CAR	11	0	1	6	6.0	6	0
2000	CAR	15	7	19	215	11.3	31	1
2001	CAR	16	10	15	89	5.9	11	2
2002	CAR	16	8	16	159	9.9	**35**	0
2003	CAR	16	11	17	199	11.7	34	0
2004	CAR	15	10	**34**	**323**	9.5	26	**3**
2005	CAR	14	9	23	202	8.8	24	2
2006	CAR	15	5	21	170	8.1	19	1
		126	61	151	1,424	9.4	35	9

=== Playoffs ===
Year	Team	Games		Receiving				
Year	Team	GP	GS	Rec	Yds	Avg	Lng	TD
2003	CAR	4	2	2	2	1.0	2	0
2005	CAR	3	0	**3**	**22**	**7.3**	**11**	**1**
		7	2	5	24	4.8	11	1

== Post-NFL career ==
On February 28, 2007, he officially retired from the NFL. In 2008, he took a position as a replacement tight ends coach at the Southern Miss. In 2009, Mangum became a loan officer with Magnolia State Bank of Mississippi, and is now DAF.

== Personal life ==
Mangum is married to Mary Ellen Coleman. He has four children.
