= Circuit rider =

Circuit rider may refer to:

- Circuit rider (water/wastewater), a position in the rural water industry
- Circuit rider (religious), a position within the Methodist Church and related denominations
  - The Circuit Rider, a sculpture of a religious circuit rider in Oregon, USA
- Circuit riding, the practice of a jurist travelling between locations
- Circuit rider (technology), a traveling technology consultants (sometimes referred to as a eRider)
- Circuit Rider (album), a 2014 album by Ron Miles
