= March 2009 tornado outbreak sequence =

Tornado outbreaks in the United States

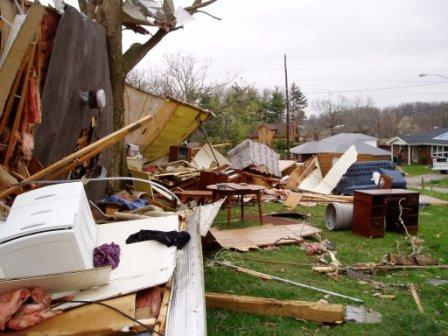
- Damage from the EF3 Corydon tornado

Meteorological history
- Date: March 23–29, 2009

Tornado outbreak
- Tornadoes: 56 confirmed
- Max. rating: EF3 tornado
- Duration: ~6 days

Overall effects
- Injuries: 41
- Damage: $14.2 million
- Part of the tornado outbreaks of 2009

The March 2009 tornado outbreak sequence was a series of tornado outbreaks which affected large portions of the Central, Southern, and Eastern United States from March 23 to March 29. A total of 56 tornadoes touched down during the event, two of which were rated as EF3.

== Meteorological synopsis ==
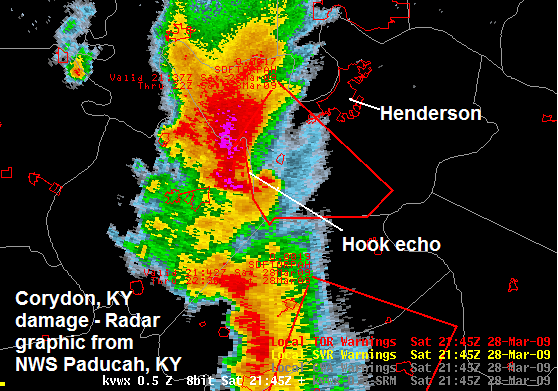
Radar image of the supercell thunderstorm which spawned the EF3 Corydon, Kentucky tornado

An upper trough moved from the Four Corners region into the southern Great Plains and lower Missouri Valley during the day on March 23. During this, a surface low in western portions of Nebraska pushed into eastern South Dakota. A cold front combined with the low moved across the central and southern Great Plains and was the main area where thunderstorm development would occur. Although moisture was limited, strong wind shear created favorable conditions for supercells to develop and rotate. As a result, the supercells had the potential to produce tornadoes. A moderate risk of severe weather was issued for portions of central and eastern Kansas and northern Oklahoma. During the day, a fast-moving supercell produced several tornadoes in eastern Nebraska and across the state line into the west central portion of Iowa. Five tornadoes occurred in eastern Nebraska, with eight people injured in Eagle. In Iowa, an EF2 tornado destroyed one home, damaged another home, a barn and seven outbuildings and derailed 54 empty grain rail cars in Harrison County. The supercell then moved into Montgomery County, where it produced two EF0 tornadoes.

Several days of severe weather began with an EF1 tornado near Meridian, Mississippi on March 25. During the early morning hours of March 26, severe thunderstorms produced six tornadoes in central sections of Mississippi. The most powerful tornado spawned was an EF3 that struck Magee. Sixty homes were either damaged or destroyed with 25 people injured from the tornado. A church was destroyed and a warehouse was severely damaged. An EF2 tornado, three EF1, and an EF0 also occurred as the severe weather moved through the area. A state of emergency was declared for 12 counties by the Governor of Mississippi Haley Barbour. The thunderstorms also produced three tornadoes, one rated EF1 and the other two rated EF0, in southeastern Louisiana and coastal regions of Mississippi. The EF1 tornado damaged seven homes, extensively damaged one trailer and injured one person in Tangipahoa Parish.

Another round of severe weather developed late that evening, producing another intense squall line with embedded tornadoes across the northern Gulf Coast region early on March 27, where several tornadoes were reported. Later during the afternoon, various tornadoes developed in North Carolina, causing structural damage in eastern North Carolina. The tornadoes formed after a disturbance moved into the area from Alabama. One of the tornadoes near Parkton was rated as an EF2 and injured one person.

On March 28, a strong 997 millibar upper-level low pressure area located over Oklahoma was forecast to produce widespread thunderstorms, with a moderate risk of severe weather in most of northern Louisiana, much of Mississippi, and southern Arkansas. A warm front was likely to develop along the leading edge of the system, allowing for atmospheric instability, a necessary component of severe thunderstorms. In areas farther north, relatively cool temperatures were anticipated to limit convective activity but very strong dynamics in the area would allow storms to develop. This would allow a thunderstorm which became separated from the main squall line to become severe and possibly tornadic. Later in the day, the Storm Prediction Center (SPC) issued a slight risk for a large area which encompassed much of the Southeast United States. Tornadic activity was less imminent due to lower dew points but strong wind shear was able to provide fuel for severe storms.

More tornadoes occurred on March 28, as they affected Tennessee and Kentucky during the afternoon. A supercell that tracked through three different counties in western areas of Kentucky produced two tornadoes. One of them was an EF3 tornado that destroyed six homes, caused major damage to 10 homes and minor damage to 60 homes and businesses in Corydon. In Tennessee, an EF1 tornado caused damage to several businesses in Murfreesboro, including the local Boys and Girls Club and a shopping plaza, which was heavily damaged. Another EF1 tornado destroyed a modular home and damaged three other homes in Ashland City.

Severe thunderstorms caused widespread damage throughout Pennsylvania on March 29. An EF1 tornado was produced in Lancaster County, damaging 238 structures across a path of 10 miles (16 km) from Lititz to Denver, most of which were 200 homes that were damaged by hail. Thirty barns suffered moderate damage, one barn sustained major damage, six trailer homes were destroyed with two others suffering major damage. Three people were injured by the tornado, which altogether cost an estimated $3 million in damage.

== Confirmed tornadoes ==
Confirmed tornadoes by Enhanced Fujita rating
EFU	EF0	EF1	EF2	EF3	EF4	EF5	Total
0	22	27	5	2	0	0	56

=== March 23 event ===
List of reported tornadoes - Monday, March 23, 2009
EF#	Location	County	Coord.	Time (UTC)	Path length	Damage
South Dakota
EF1	SW of Springfield	Bon Homme	42.81°N 97.97°W	2115	unknown	A machine shed was heavily damaged.
Nebraska
EF1	S of Eagle	Lancaster, Otoe, Cass	40.79°N 96.43°W	2145	9 miles (14 km)	Tornado hit a garage and sent a car rolling, injuring five people.
EF1	NE of Eagle	Cass	40.85°N 96.43°W	2150	4 miles (6.4 km)	A tree fell on a truck, injuring three people.
EF1	NE of Alvo	Cass	40.82°N 96.43°W	2200	5 miles (8.0 km)	
EF1	SE of Hickman	Lancaster		unknown	2 miles (3.2 km)	
EF2	NE of Hickman	Lancaster		unknown	1 mile (1.6 km)	
Iowa
EF2	Missouri Valley area	Harrison	41.58°N 95.87°W	2305	9 miles (14 km)	A farm house was heavily damaged and seven outbuildings were destroyed. 54 rail cars were also overturned.
EF0	W of Villisca	Montgomery	40.98°N 94.91°W	0100	3 miles (4.8 km)	A grain bin was overturned and an outbuilding was damaged.
EF0	ESE of Lyman	Cass	41.23°N 94.89°W	0110	5 miles (8.0 km)	Narrow tornado path with damage to silos and outbuildings.
EF0	S of Wiota	Cass		0120	1 mile (1.6 km)	Narrow tornado path with minor damage.
EF0	Sciola	Montgomery		unknown	1.25 miles (2.01 km)	A weak outbuilding was destroyed and some trees were damaged.
Kansas
EF1	E of Bern	Nemaha	39.96°N 95.97°W	2333	8.5 miles (13.7 km)	Numerous buildings and power poles were damaged.
Sources: SPC Storm Reports for 03/23/09, NWS Des Moines, NWS Omaha, NWS Topeka

=== March 24 event ===
List of reported tornadoes - Tuesday, March 24, 2009
EF#	Location	County/ Parish	Coord.	Time (UTC)	Path length	Damage
Louisiana
EF1	WNW of Jonesboro	Jackson	32.24°N 92.73°W	0410	1 mile (1.6 km)	
Oklahoma
EF0	SE of Pawnee	Pawnee		0629	3.5 miles (5.6 km)	A mobile home was damaged and a storage barn was destroyed. Numerous trees were snapped.
Sources: SPC Storm Reports for 03/24/09, NWS Tulsa

=== March 25–26 event ===
This event covers through the morning of March 26, which was due to a continuous bow echo/line.

List of reported tornadoes - Wednesday, March 25, 2009
EF#	Location	County/ Parish	Coord.	Time (UTC)	Path length	Damage
Mississippi
EF1	S of Meridian	Lauderdale	32.25°N 88.71°W	1559	5.5 miles (8.9 km)	Many trees were knocked down, damaging a church. A house also lost its roof.
EF0	S of Edwards	Hinds		0444	3 miles (4.8 km)	A house lost its roof and several other houses sustained minor damage.
Louisiana
EF0	E of Pleasant Hill	Natchitoches	31.85°N 93.42°W	0050	unknown	Brief tornado in a wooded area with damage limited to trees.
Sources: SPC Storm Reports for 03/25/09, NWS Jackson

List of reported tornadoes - Thursday, March 26, 2009
EF#	Location	County/ Parish	Coord.	Time (UTC)	Path length	Damage
Mississippi
EF1	N of Clinton	Hinds, Madison		0500	12 miles (19 km)	Hundreds of trees were uprooted along its track.
EF1	NW of Madison (1st tornado)	Madison		0517	4.5 miles (7.2 km)	Several houses sustained damage, mostly to their roofs. Many trees were snapped.
EF0	NW of Madison (2nd tornado)	Madison		0520	1 mile (1.6 km)	Minor shingle damage to several houses and minor tree damage.
EF3	Magee area	Simpson, Smith		0637	17.5 miles (28.2 km)	Severe damage to 60 houses, many of which were destroyed. A large well-built church was also destroyed. A warehouse and a radio tower also sustained major damage and extensive tree damage was reported. 25 people were injured.
EF1	E of Montrose	Jasper, Newton		0731	17 miles (27 km)	Several houses were damaged, at least four of which were heavily damaged. An old church building was destroyed.
EF2	N of Soso	Jones		0743	9 miles (14 km)	Numerous houses were damaged, with a well-built house heavily damaged. Several warehouses were destroyed. Several mobile homes were damaged, one of which was destroyed. One person were injured.
EF0	Pascagoula	Jackson	30.37°N 88.55°W	1033	250 yards (230 m)	Brief tornado touched down at Pascagoula High School with minor damage at its fields. Several traffic lights were damaged.
Louisiana
EF1	E of Independence	Tangipahoa	30.64°N 90.47°W	0658	0.75 miles (1.21 km)	Seven houses were damaged and two mobile homes were heavily damaged, one of which was destroyed. One person was injured.
EF0	SSE of Slidell	St. Tammany	30.25°N 89.76°W	0843	250 yards (230 m)	Brief tornado in a residential subdivision with minor tree damage but no building damage.
Alabama
EF1	WNW of Ashcraft Corner	Lamar, Fayette	33.54°N 87.95°W	0820	3.33 miles (5.36 km)	Two homes, one business and five outbuildings were damaged.
EF0	Alabaster	Shelby	33.21°N 86.86°W	0950	3.75 miles (6.04 km)	Brief tornado damaged three houses near exit 238 on Interstate 65.
EF1	E of Appleton	Escambia	31.22°N 87.11°W	1155	2.09 miles (3.36 km)	Several houses and outbuildings were damaged and a barn was destroyed.
Sources: SPC Storm Reports for 03/25/09, NWS Jackson, NWS New Orleans/Baton Rouge, NWS Mobile, NWS Birmingham

=== March 26–27 event ===
This event covers through the morning of March 27, which was due to a continuous bow echo/line.

List of reported tornadoes - Thursday, March 26, 2009
EF#	Location	County/ Parish	Coord.	Time (UTC)	Path length	Damage
Louisiana
EF1	E of Gonzales	Ascension	30.22°N 90.87°W	0412	1.25 miles (2.01 km)	Tornado embedded in an evening line of activity. One structure was destroyed and 30 others were damaged, 10 of them heavily including a large commercial building.
EF1	N of Pearl River	St. Tammany	30.42°N 89.75°W	0630	0.33 miles (0.53 km)	Brief tornado with heavy roof damage to three houses.
Mississippi
EF1	N of Diamondhead	Hancock	30.64°N 89.37°W	0645	7 miles (11 km)	A church sustained significant roof damage and an outbuilding was destroyed.
Sources: SPC Storm Reports for 03/26/09, NWS New Orleans/Baton Rouge

=== March 27 event ===
This event covers activity in the afternoon and evening of March 27.

List of reported tornadoes - Friday, March 27, 2009
EF#	Location	County/Parish	Coord.	Time (UTC)	Path length	Damage
North Carolina
EF0	SE of Lumberton	Robeson	34.56°N 78.97°W	2032	2.3 miles (3.7 km)	Narrow tornado track with a shed destroyed and a mobile home damaged.
EF2	E of Parkton	Robeson	34.89°N 78.96°W	2102	2 miles (3.2 km)	Narrow but strong tornado roughly paralleled Interstate 95. An empty house was destroyed and a mobile home was also destroyed, injuring an occupant.
EF1	SE of Hope Mills	Cumberland	34.95°N 78.93°W	2113	5 miles (8.0 km)	Several houses and businesses - including a large research building - sustained damage, mostly to roofs. A tractor-trailer was overturned on Interstate 95.
EF1	Greenville	Pitt	35.60°N 77.37°W	2205	0.5 miles (800 m)	Brief tornado with minor damage to about 40 houses.
EF1	W of Hookerton	Greene	35.42°N 77.62°W	2205	1.5 miles (2.4 km)	
EF0	N of Salemburg	Sampson		unknown	unknown	Confirmed tornado according to NWS Raleigh tornado summary
EF0	S of Four Oaks	Sampson, Johnston		unknown	unknown	Confirmed tornado according to NWS Raleigh tornado summary
Louisiana
EF0	W of Gardner	Rapides	31.27°N 92.78°W	2110	2 miles (3.2 km)	Damaging limited to trees with two of trees falling on houses while some vehicles were trapped
EF0	SSW of Brownsville-Bawcon	Ouachita	32.36°N 92.26°W	0357	unknown	Damage to trees and a fence
Sources: SPC Storm Reports for 03/27/09, NWS Wilmington (NC), NWS Raleigh, NWS Newport/Morehead City, NWS Lake Charles, LA, NWS Raleigh (Event Summary)

=== March 28 event ===
List of reported tornadoes - Saturday, March 28, 2009
EF#	Location	County	Coord.	Time (UTC)	Path length	Damage
Mississippi
EF1	SE of Raleigh	Smith	31.91°N 89.46°W	0758	1 mile (1.6 km)	Four houses sustained minor to moderate damage. Two sheds were also destroyed and trees were damaged.
Georgia
EF0	NW of Vienna	Dooly	32.13°N 83.84°W	1450	500 yards (460 m)	Brief tornado touchdown
Kentucky
EF1	SE of Morganfield	Union	37.68°N 87.91°W	2123	2.5 miles (4.0 km)	Two camper trailer were overturned and a barn lost its roof. Several trees were damaged.
EF3	Corydon area	Union, Henderson	37.79°N 87.71°W	2143	12 miles (19 km)	See section on this tornado
EF0	SE of Owensboro	Daviess	37°42′N 87°01′W	2238	0.1 miles (0.16 km)	A small rope tornado briefly touched down in an open field.
South Carolina
EF1	SE of Summerton	Clarendon	33°34′N 80°17′W	2131	4 miles (6.4 km)	Tornado touched down in a wooded area, downing numerous trees.
Tennessee
EF1	NE of Ashland City	Cheatham	36.28°N 87.06°W	2235	5 miles (8.0 km)	A modular home was destroyed with damage to three other homes. Numerous trees were snapped.
EF1	Murfreesboro	Rutherford	35.85°N 86.43°W	2350	1.1 miles (1.8 km)	Several businesses were damaged, including the local Boys and Girls Club and a shopping plaza which were heavily damaged. Numerous houses were also damaged. Damages from the tornado were estimated to be over $4.4 million.
EF1	Huntland	Franklin	35.15°N 86.27°W	0015	1.5 miles (2.4 km)	Minor damage to a house and a barn. Numerous trees snapped or broken.
EF0	SE of Dunlap	Sequatchie	35.35°N 85.36°W	0153	1 mile (1.6 km)	Damage to trees.
North Carolina
EF2	N of Clarkton	Bladen	34.54°N 78.67°W	0108	1.6 miles (2.6 km)	One home was significantly damaged with a cinder block storage being destroyed and part of the back of the home being lifted from the foundation. Three other homes were damaged. Damage to farm and other storage/cinder block buildings.
EF0	NW of White Lake	Bladen	34.73°N 78.52°W	0136	0.25 miles (0.40 km)	Brief touchdown with damage limited to trees.
Alabama
EF1	W of Valley Head	DeKalb	34.56°N 85.65°W	0120	2.6 miles (4.2 km)	Many trees, mostly tall pines, were uprooted. Some of them fell on a house, heavily damaging it.
EF0	NE of Pisgah	Jackson		unknown	1.6 miles (2.6 km)	Two houses sustained roof damage and a barn was heavily damaged.
Sources: SPC Storm Reports for 03/28/09, NWS Jackson, MS, NWS Nashville, NWS Paducah, NWS Wilmington, NC, NWS Huntsville, NWS Columbia

=== March 29 event ===
List of reported tornadoes - Sunday, March 29, 2009
EF#	Location	County	Coord.	Time (UTC)	Path length	Damage
Pennsylvania
EF1	Lititz area	Lancaster	40°09′N 76°18′W	2042	1.25 miles (2.01 km)	A short lived EF1 tornado touched down in the town of Litiz and tracked 1.25 miles (2.01 km) before lifting near Ephrata. At least 200 structures were damaged by the tornado and six mobile homes were destroyed. Three people were injured by the tornado and damages amounted to $1 million.
Sources: SPC Reports 03/29/2009, NWS State College

=== Corydon, Kentucky ===
Corydon, Kentucky
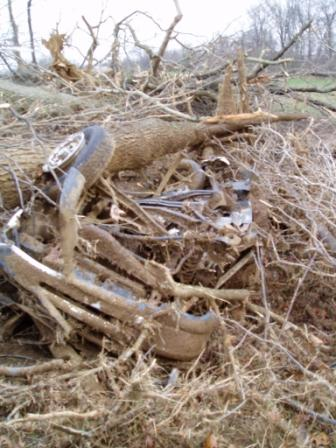
- The remains of a truck, crushed by trees, which was thrown roughly a quarter mile by the tornado.

Meteorological history
- Formed: March 28, 2009, 4:43 p.m. EST (UTC−05:00)
- Dissipated: March 28, 2009, 5:00 p.m. EST (UTC−05:00)
- Duration: 17 minutes

EF3 tornado
- on the Enhanced Fujita scale
- Highest winds: 140 mph (230 km/h)

Overall effects
- Injuries: 2
- Damage: $540,000

Surface heating throughout the day destabilized the atmosphere ahead of a cold front in the Tennessee and Ohio Valleys. At 2:20 pm CST, the Storm Prediction Center in Norman, Oklahoma issued a tornado watch for western Kentucky, central Tennessee, and northern Alabama. Not long after, supercell thunderstorms began to develop over southern Illinois, producing hail up to 1 inch in diameter. By 4:00 pm CST, a supercell thunderstorm developed in western Kentucky, near the border with Illinois, and a severe thunderstorm warning was issued for the storm. Shortly after, a tornado warning was issued around 4:30 pm CST for Union County, Kentucky as doppler radar images depicted rotation in the thunderstorm. Around 4:43 pm CST, a tornado touched down about 5 miles south-southwest of Waverly, Kentucky and tracked towards the northeast along Kentucky Route 141. Not long after the tornado touched down, it crossed into Henderson County. At 4:48 pm CST, the tornado intensified into an EF3 and passed directly over the town of Corydon. After causing severe damage in Corydon, the tornado continued towards the northeast before dissipating south of the Henderson County Airport around 5:00 pm. The tornado was on the ground for roughly 12 miles over a 17-minute span.

Although four tornado sirens failed to sound when the tornado warning was issued for Corydon, no fatalities were reported as a result of the tornado. About 70 structures were damaged and six were destroyed by the tornado and two people were injured. One of the injuries was caused after a man was struck by a television which was thrown by the tornado. Numerous residents were caught off guard by the tornado, with some people remaining outside after the warning was issued. Concrete and brick structures collapsed, mobile homes were destroyed with debris wrapped around trees, and power lines were downed throughout the area. One truck was picked up by the tornado and thrown about 0.25 miles. An oil well also leaked into a creek as a result of the tornado. Most homes in the town of 780 people were left without power. Damages from the tornado amounted to $540,000.

==== Aftermath ====
A state of emergency was declared for Henderson County on March 30, two days after the tornado hit Corydon. The following day, Red Cross workers arrived in the town and set up their operations center in the Old Corydon School; however, not many people went to the center to receive aid.

=== Siren malfunction ===
Following the impact of the EF3 tornado, emergency management officials discovered that four of the ten sirens which were supposed to go off when the tornado warning was issued for Henderson County did not function. Emergency management personnel worked to replace the batteries in all ten sirens in the days after the tornado but lacked the supplies to complete this. Since the battery replacement was not completed, two more sirens failed on April 2 when a possible tornado touched down in the same area. After the April 2 event, the repair of the tornado sirens was completed and they were all working.

== Non-tornadic events ==
=== March 23 Iowa squall line ===
Ahead of the developing low pressure area, a squall line of thunderstorms developed along a low-level jet stream. The line was first noted around 3:35 am CDT in Cass County, Iowa where 61 miles per hour (98 km/h) winds were recorded at the Atlantic Municipal Airport. Later that day, a much stronger line of severe thunderstorms developed in Plymouth County. Wind gusts up to 80 miles per hour (130 km/h) were recorded in the county, two barns and a horse shed were shifted off their foundation and several trees were uprooted. In Cherokee County, a semi-truck was blown over by high winds.

== See also ==
- List of North American tornadoes and tornado outbreaks
