= John Mangum (defensive tackle) =

American football player (1942–1994)

Profile
- Position: Defensive tackle

Personal information
- Born: September 30, 1942; Magee, Mississippi, U.S.
- Died: April 29, 1994 (aged 51); Jackson, Mississippi, U.S.
- Listed height: 6 ft 1 in (1.85 m)
- Listed weight: 270 lb (122 kg)

Career information
- High school: Magee (Magee, Mississippi)
- College: Ole Miss; Southern Miss
- AFL draft: 1966: 5th round, 35th overall pick

Career history
- Boston Patriots (1966–1967)
- Stats at Pro Football Reference

John Wayne "Big John" Mangum Sr. (September 30, 1942 – April 29, 1994) was an American professional football defensive tackle in the American Football League (AFL). He played college football for the Ole Miss Rebels and the Southern Miss Golden Eagles and was selected by the Boston Patriots in the fifth round of the 1966 AFL draft.

== College career ==
Mangum started his collegiate career at Ole Miss before transferring to Southern Mississippi. He was considered the anchor of the Golden Eagles' defensive line when the team led the nation in total defense in his junior and senior seasons. Mangum played in the Blue–Gray Football Classic and the Senior Bowl after his senior season.

== Professional career ==
Mangum was selected 35th overall in the fifth round of the 1966 American Football League draft by the Boston Patriots. He played two seasons for the Patriots, playing in 28 games.

== Personal life ==
Mangum is the father of former Alabama and Chicago Bears defensive back John Mangum and former Carolina Panthers tight end Kris Mangum. His grandson, Jake Mangum, played college baseball at Mississippi State and is the Southeastern Conference's career hit leader and is now centerfielder for the Pittsburgh Pirates.
