= National Rural Water Association =

American water and wastewater utility membership organization

- Location: 2915 S. 13th Street, Duncan, OK 73533
- Coordinates: 34.4715°N 97.9653°W
- Website: nrwa.org

The National Rural Water Association (NRWA), with its affiliated state rural water associations, is the largest water and wastewater utility membership organization in the United States of America. The NRWA is a professional organization that supports rural and small water utilities throughout the nation. NRWA and its state affiliates are organized as a non-profit trade association, and represent more than 31,000 water and wastewater utility members.

The association provides training, technical assistance and source water protection assistance to the rural and small utilities which comprise 94 percent of the nation's community water supplies. This assistance is supported by the United States Congress and is provided in partnership with the USDA's Rural Utilities Service, the Farm Service Agency and the Environmental Protection Agency.

The NRWA and state rural water affiliates also represent rural and small utilities in the regulatory and legislative process.

== History ==
The National Rural Water Association was founded in 1976 in response to the Safe Drinking Water Act, passed in 1974. The SDWA authorized the United States Environmental Protection Agency to set national health-based standards for drinking water to protect against both naturally occurring and man-made contaminants that may be found in drinking water. The NRWA was founded because many of the original EPA standards were written for large metropolitan water utilities, and many smaller utilities did not have the resources to meet those standards.

NRWA's first meeting in Oklahoma City was attended by eight states: Kansas, Missouri, North Carolina, North Dakota, South Dakota, Oklahoma, Indiana and Texas. States quickly joined the organization with Alabama, Arkansas, Iowa and South Carolina joining in 1977; Louisiana, Minnesota, Mississippi, Nebraska, New Mexico, Oregon and Tennessee 1978; and Florida, Illinois, Kentucky, Maine, Montana, New York, Ohio in 1979 and Arizona in 1990. Hawaii incorporated its rural water association in December 2010, bringing NRWA programs to all 50 states.

The Circuit Rider Program, a signature of NRWA, began in 1980 in 18 states. Circuit riders are roving drinking water and wastewater experts that provided technical assistance to the unities in their area. The program provided another tool for small water systems that did not always have the experience, equipment, training or personnel to deal large or persistent problems.

During its operation, the NRWA has added a variety of training, technical assistance, source water protection and financial programs to assist small water and waste water systems. The NRWA's network of training and assistance had allowed rural and small community water supplies to maintain compliance with the SDWA at rates similar to metropolitan systems on a percentage basis.

== Quality on Tap and Protecting Our Environment ==

"Quality On Tap – Our Commitment – Our Profession" is a nationwide, grassroots public relations and awareness campaign designed especially for the drinking water industry. QOT is intended to promote a positive image to the public, focusing on the safety of drinking water and the expertise of the technical professional who ensure water quality.

"Protecting Our Environment" is a companion campaign for the wastewater industry. This campaign is designed to publicize the credentials of the wastewater personnel and the role they play in Environmental Protection, especially the prevention of water pollution. Rural water has made environmental protection, especially source water protection, a priority for the industry.

Both campaigns were designed to be practical, hands-on guides to better public relations for rural and small water and wastewater utilities.

== Programs ==
The NRWA and its state affiliates provide a range of programs to assist utilities in their governance, management, finance and operations. Annually over 100,000 personnel are trained and over 100,000 types of on-site technical assistance is rendered throughout the 50 United States, and Puerto Rico.

Training and technical assistance is delivered through a cadre of personnel with a range of technical and practical experience. This technical knowledge, combined with the experience of managing and operating water and wastewater systems has allowed NRWA training, assistance and “common sense solutions” that are practical at the local level.

=== Member support services ===
NWRA and the state associations offer a variety of support services provided to member utilities. All support services are delivered through the state associations. These may include but are not limited to revolving loan funds, insurance, discounts, bond pools, certification, background checks, conferences, legislative events on the state and national level and a VIP Fleet Discount for systems of any size and any number of vehicles.

These programs and services available through the NRWA homepage or state associations.

Starting around 2024, NWRA began partnering with DEF CON Franklin on efforts to provide cybersecurity assistance to rural utilities.

== Emergency Response/Disaster Relief ==
NRWA and its state affiliates provide assistance to small systems recovering from disasters. This assistance is considered to be an extension of the regular services provided to small water utilities: "It's the same thing we do every day, just with more urgency and immediate need."

These efforts have been praised for their ability to quickly provide responsive, meaningful assistance to small utilities and support repair efforts months, even years after the disaster.

Rural water relief efforts since 2008 include assistance to areas damaged by hurricanes (Hurricane Gustav, Hurricane Hanna, and Hurricane Ike), tornados (Parkersburg Tornado, Picher Tornado, Dierks Tornado and Magee Tornado), floods, and ice storms (2009 Ice Storms).

In 2009, NRWA instituted a training program to educate, train and certify Rural Water staff in emergency response. The program provides training in hands-on skills for field staff, and organizational training for association leaders. Field staff training includes instruction on planning and preparedness, assessment and documentation, safety, power generation, and the operation of emergency generators. Leadership training includes more focus on planning, organization, leadership and management during emergency and disaster situations.

== Members ==
Small communities comprise more than 94 percent of the community water supplies NRWA through its state affiliates represents 26,696 water and utility members from 48 non-profit, state rural water associations that cover the 50 United States and Puerto Rico.

=== State Affiliates ===
State Affiliates
Alabama	Indiana	Montana	Pennsylvania
Alaska	Iowa	Nebraska	South Carolina
Arizona	Kansas	Nevada	South Dakota
Arkansas	Kentucky	New Hampshire	Tennessee
Atlantic States	Louisiana	New Jersey	Texas
California	Maine	New Mexico	Utah
Colorado	Maryland	New York	Vermont
Delaware	Massachusetts	North Carolina	Virginia
Florida	Michigan	North Dakota	Washington
Georgia	Minnesota	Ohio	West Virginia
Idaho	Mississippi	Oklahoma	Wisconsin
Illinois	Missouri	Oregon	Wyoming
Hawaii

== Sources ==
- National Rural Water Association
