= Circuit rider (water/wastewater) =

Organizations that provide assistance to small water and wastewater utilities

Rural water circuit riders are roving technical experts employed by state rural water associations to provide training and assistance to rural and small water utilities within their state.

== History ==
The National Rural Water Association began its circuit rider program in 1980. The program was intended to provide support for small utility systems that did not always have the experience, equipment, training or personnel to deal with large or persistent problems. Circuit riders usually operate within a specific area of their designated state, visiting the small utilities on a regular basis.

== Drinking water/wastewater ==
Circuit riders are usually categorized as either drinking water or wastewater specialists. Drinking water circuit riders specialize in the supply, treatment and distribution of clean drinking water through a water utility. Wastewater circuit riders specialize in the processes required for the safe collection, treatment and disposal of wastewater and sewage. Circuit riders in both fields have extensive knowledge and experience with the state and federal regulations governing drinking water and wastewater.

== Management and accounting ==
Some state associations have circuit riders who specialize in assisting utilities with management, accounting and record-keeping issues. These circuit riders are often asked to perform rate studies, which examine a utility's expenses and incomes and recommends rates that allows them to meet their financial obligations.

== Sources ==
- National Rural Water Association
