= Simpson County School District =

School district in Mississippi, United States

The Simpson County School District is a public school district based in Mendenhall, Mississippi, USA. The district's boundaries parallel those of Simpson County.

== Schools ==
- Magee High School
- Mendenhall High School
- Magee Middle School
- Mendenhall Junior High School
- Magee Elementary School
- Mendenhall Elementary School
- Simpson Central School

In 2022 the district plans to consolidate the two high schools into a single school. The two were previously athletic rivals. The athletic rivalry had been in place in the preceding decades.

Mac Gordon, a former newspaper employee from McComb, Mississippi who wrote an editorial for The Clarion Ledger, described the consolidation as "stunning news" considering that it involves two high schools with "sound" performance in academic parameters, in "progressive communities with much pride" in these institutions. The consolidated facility will be known as Simpson County High School. In February 2022 the district proposed a bond for $39 million for the new high school; if passed, the art and sports facilities would open at the same time the new high school opens. Voters rejected the bond.

== Demographics ==
=== 2006-07 school year ===
There were a total of 4,292 students enrolled in the Simpson County School District during the 2006–2007 school year. The gender makeup of the district was 48% female and 52% male. The racial makeup of the district was 52.40% African American, 46.44% White, 0.89% Hispanic, 0.16% Native American, and 0.12% Asian. 67.1% of the district's students were eligible to receive free lunch.

=== Previous school years ===
School Year	Enrollment	Gender Makeup		Racial Makeup				
School Year	Enrollment	Female	Male	Asian	African American	Hispanic	Native American	White
2005-06	4,253	48%	52%	0.21%	52.29%	0.85%	0.12%	46.53%
2004-05	4,266	48%	52%	0.14%	52.39%	0.54%	0.16%	46.77%
2003-04	4,249	48%	52%	0.09%	51.89%	0.47%	0.09%	47.45%
2002-03	4,369	48%	52%	0.07%	51.32%	0.55%	0.07%	48.00%

== Accountability statistics ==
	2006-07	2005-06	2004-05	2003-04	2002-03
District Accreditation Status	Accredited	Accredited	Accredited	Accredited	Accredited
School Performance Classifications
Level 5 (Superior Performing) Schools	0	0	0	0	0
Level 4 (Exemplary) Schools	2	1	0	1	0
Level 3 (Successful) Schools	4	6	7	6	6
Level 2 (Under Performing) Schools	1	0	0	0	1
Level 1 (Low Performing) Schools	0	0	0	0	0
Not Assigned	0	0	0	0	0

== See also ==
- List of school districts in Mississippi
