= Keren Elazari =

Cybersecurity expert

- קרן אלעזרי
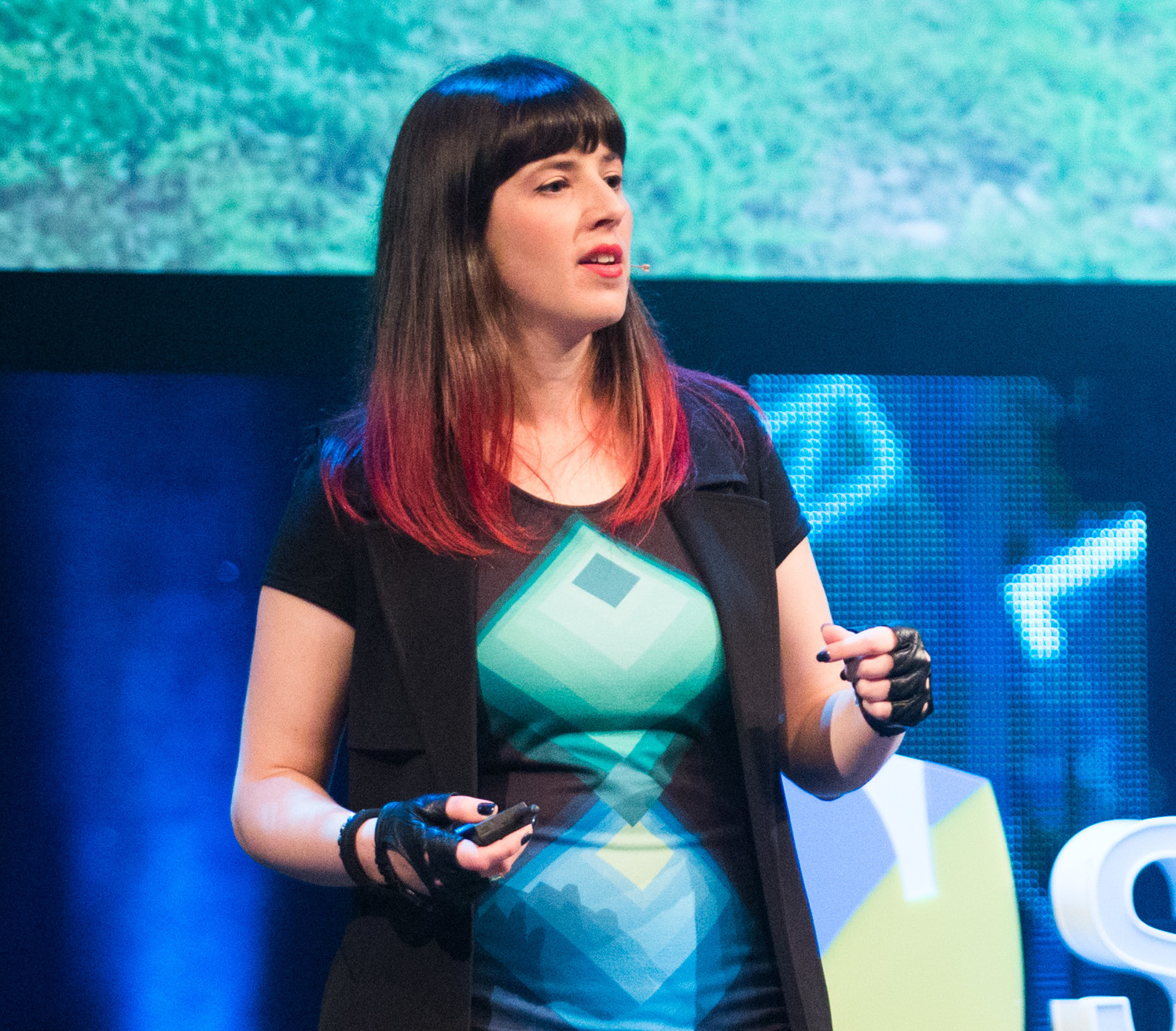
- Keren Elazari in 2016
- Born: 1981 (age 44–45); Tel Aviv, Israel
- Education: Tel Aviv University (BA, MA)
- Occupation: Security researcher
- Website: www.k3r3n3.com

Keren Elazari (Hebrew: קרן אלעזרי; born 1981), also known as k3r3n3, is an Israeli cybersecurity analyst, writer, and speaker. She is a senior researcher at the Tel Aviv University Interdisciplinary Cyber Research Center.

== Early life and education ==
Elazari was born in 1981 and grew up in Tel Aviv, Israel. Her father is Ami Elazari, the CEO of an electric company and a former member of the Israel Defense Forces intelligence group, Unit 8200. Her mother works for an airline. Internet became available in Tel Aviv when Elazari was eleven or twelve years old, and she says she learned English and learned about hacking in online chat rooms. In 1995, when she was 14, she saw the film Hackers. She said the story, which portrayed a young group of hackers as heroes, served as inspiration for her to become a white-hat hacker.

Elazari was drafted into the Israel Defense Forces, where she asked to be placed in a role relating to information security. She ultimately served in the army for a total of ten years, both in the standing army and later in the reserve, and was a cybersecurity officer in the intelligence arm. She attended Tel Aviv University, where she earned her Bachelor of Arts in history and philosophy of science and ideas and her Master of Arts in security studies. She also has the Certified Information Systems Security Professional (CISSP) certification, which she earned in 2007. In 2004, she organized with Neora Shem-Shaul Y2hack4, the second Israeli hackers conference.

== Career ==
Elazari is a senior researcher at the Tel Aviv University's Cyber Research Center. She was also a teaching fellow at Singularity University in California from 2012 until at least 2018. Her areas of research include cyberwarfare and politics. Outside of academia, Elazari was a white-hat hacker, and continues to work as a security consultant. In the past she has worked with various companies and organisations, including as a security specialist and industry analyst with Gigaom Research, and as an adviser to the cryptocurrency technology company Epiphyte.

Elazari runs BSides Tel Aviv, a hacking and cybersecurity research conference in Tel Aviv. She also runs a professional meetup for women in cybersecurity.

Elazari has given several talks about the positive impact of hackers, and has spoken and written about the dynamic between hackers, the government, and private companies. In 2014, Elazari gave a popular TED talk titled "Hackers: The Internet's Immune System". She spoke about hackers, the ethics of hacking, and the importance of engaging with hackers to improve cybersecurity. She was the first Israeli woman to give a TED Talk. She spoke at DEF CON 22 in 2014, delivering a talk titled "Empowering Hackers to Create a Positive Impact", and has spoken at other conferences including the Atlantic Security Conference in Halifax, Nova Scotia in 2015. Elazari has written articles in publications including Scientific American and Wired.

== Publications ==
- Wheeler, Tarah (2016). Women In Tech: Take Your Career to the Next Level with Practical Advice and Inspiring Stories. Chang, Angie; Cunningham, Katie; Elazari, Keren; Johnson, Miah; Smith, Kristin Toth; Taylor, Kamilah; Wu, Brianna (Contributors). Sasquatch Books.
