= Tara Wheeler =

Tara Wheeler may refer to:

- Tara Wheeler (cricketer) (born 1999), Australian cricketer
- Tara Wheeler (Miss Virginia) (born 1984), American beauty pageant contestant and news anchor
- Tarah Wheeler (born 1979), American author
