= Think Smart, Be Fearless =

Biography of Bill Gates published in 2019

Think Smart, Be Fearless: A Biography of Bill Gates
- Author: Sharon Mentyka
- Illustrator: Vivien Mildenberger
- Genre: Biography; Children's literature
- Published: 2019 (Sasquatch Books)
- ISBN: 978-1632171764

Think Smart, Be Fearless: A Biography of Bill Gates is a 2019 picture book biography of Bill Gates written by Sharon Mentyka and illustrated by Vivien Mildenberger. The book was first published by Sasquatch Books.

The book has received reviews from publications including Publishers Weekly, School Library Journal, Kirkus Reviews, and GeekDad.
