= Penguin Random House =

British-American publishing company

Penguin Random House LLC Penguin Random House Limited
- Logo used since 2024

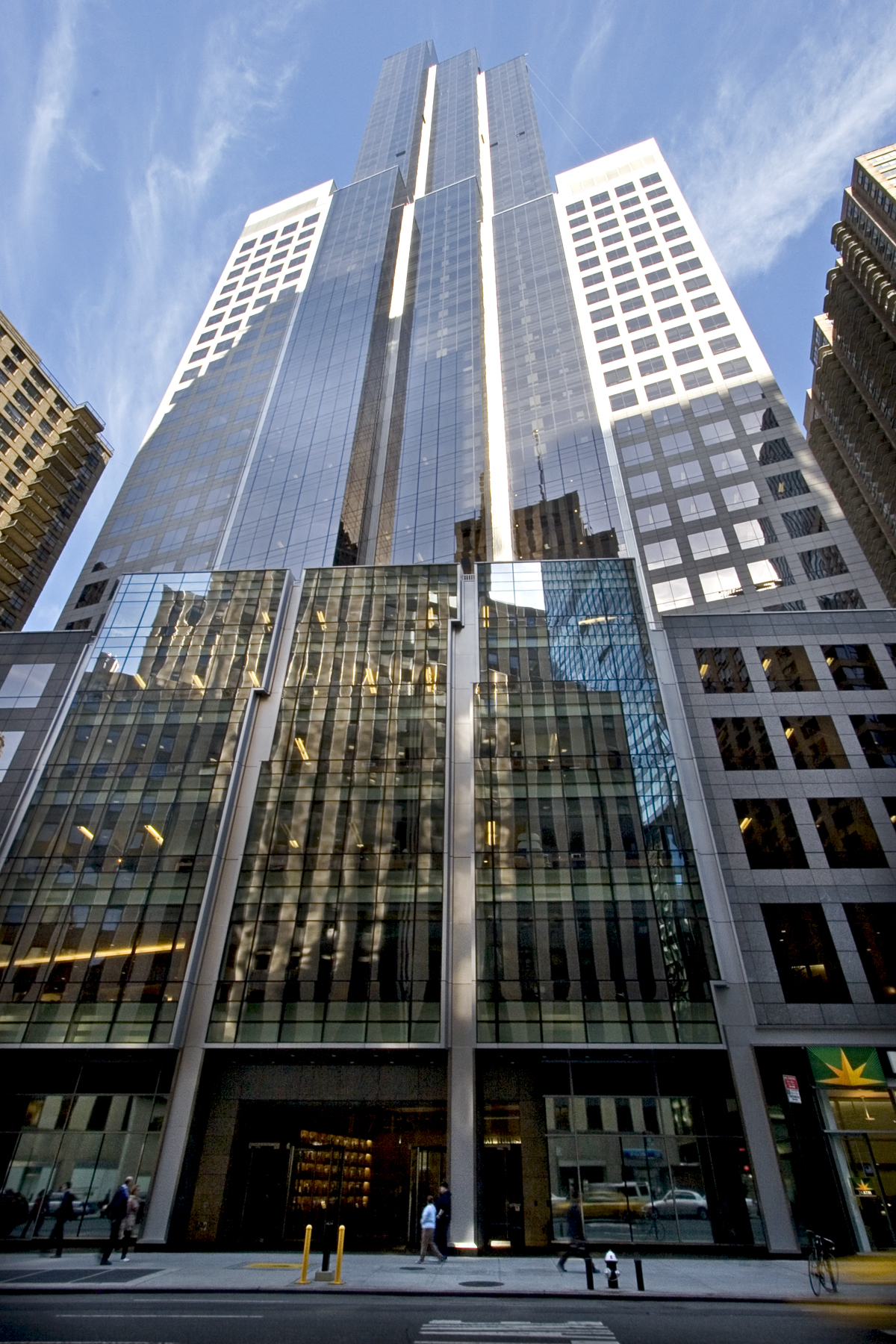
- Headquarters at the Random House Tower in New York
- Type: Subsidiary
- Founded: July 1, 2013; 13 years ago
- Headquarters: Random House Tower, New York City, United States
- Number of locations: One Embassy Gardens, 8 Viaduct Gardens, Nine Elms, London SW11 7BW, United Kingdom (Note: UK headquarters)
- Area served: Worldwide
- Key people: Nihar Malaviya (CEO); Thomas Rabe (chairman); Madeline McIntosh (former CEO, PRH US); Jim Johnston (former CFO)
- Products: Books
- Revenue: ▲€4.53 billion (2023)
- Number of employees: 10,000 (as of July 1, 2013)
- Parent: Bertelsmann
- Website: global.penguinrandomhouse.com

Penguin Random House LLC is a British-American multinational publishing conglomerate, created on July 1, 2013, through the merger of Penguin Books and Random House. Along with Simon & Schuster, Hachette, HarperCollins and Macmillan Publishers, Penguin Random House is considered one of the "Big Five" English-language publishers.

In 2020, Bertelsmann became the sole owner of Penguin Random House after a 2019 purchase. The integration of its own German-language publishing group, Verlagsgruppe Random House, added 45 imprints to the company, for a total of 365 imprints.

As of 2021, Penguin Random House employed about 10,000 people globally and published 15,000 titles annually in all genres and formats. Penguin Random House comprises Penguin and Random House in the United States, the United Kingdom, Canada, Australia, New Zealand, Portugal, and India; Penguin in Brazil, Asia and South Africa; Dorling Kindersley worldwide; and Random House's companies in Spain, Hispanic America, and Germany.

On November 25, 2020, The New York Times reported that Penguin Random House was planning to purchase Simon & Schuster from ViacomCBS (later known as Paramount Global) for $2.175 billion. However, on November 2, 2021, the U.S. Department of Justice sued to stop the deal on antitrust grounds, a suit that eventually succeeded on October 31, 2022. The deal formally collapsed on November 22, 2022.

== History ==
Penguin Random House was formed on July 1, 2013, by Markus Dohle upon the completion of a £2.4 billion transaction between Bertelsmann and Pearson to merge their respective trade publishing companies, Random House and Penguin Group. Bertelsmann and Pearson, the parent companies, initially owned 53% and 47%, respectively. Jane Ciabattari of Library Journal has referred to this merger as the publishing industry's response to the increasing dominance of Amazon.com in the book market. Dohle was named CEO of the new company, which had more than 10,000 employees worldwide with more than 250 imprints and publishing houses and a publishing list of more than 15,000 new titles a year. Penguin Random House relaunched Book Country, Penguin's online writing community, on July 29, 2013. On September 24, 2014, Random House Studio signed a first-look production deal with Universal Pictures, under which Random House would be the producer of films based on Penguin Random House books. The Universal subsidiary Focus Features has frequently collaborated with Random House Films. Having previously created Puffin Rock animation, Richard Haines was chosen to head Penguin Random House Children's TV development strategy with the assistance of licensing, publishing, and TV development executive Emily Campan.

In November 2015, Pearson announced it would rebrand to focus on its education division. On July 11, 2017, Pearson sold 22% of its stake in the business to Bertelsmann, thereby retaining a 25% holding. On December 18, 2019, Bertelsmann agreed to acquire Pearson's 25% stake in Penguin Random House, making it a wholly owned subsidiary of Bertelsmann. The sale was completed on April 2, 2020. In June 2020, Penguin Random House became part of a group of publishers who sued the Internet Archive, arguing that its collection of e-books was denying authors and publishers revenue and accusing the library of "willful mass copyright infringement".

On November 25, 2020, Penguin Random House agreed to purchase American publisher Simon & Schuster from ViacomCBS for $2.175 billion, with a formal regulatory approval process to follow the purchase agreement. On November 2, 2021, the US Justice Department filed a civil antitrust lawsuit to block Penguin Random House's proposed acquisition of Simon & Schuster, alleging that the acquisition would create a publisher with too much influence over books and author payments. In October 2022, the U.S. District Court for the District of Columbia ruled in favor of the Justice Department. On November 21, 2022, Penguin Random House officially scrapped the deal. As a result, it was to pay a $200 million termination fee to the recently rebranded Paramount Global. Simon & Schuster would instead be sold to Kohlberg Kravis Roberts on October 30, 2023.

In July 2024, it was announced that Penguin Random House would acquire comic book publisher Boom! Studios.

== Divisions and imprints ==
=== DK ===
DK (Dorling Kindersley) was founded in London in 1974.

- Alpha, publishes Complete Idiot's Guides

As of 2015, DK also has official publishing relationships with Angry Birds, Lego, Marvel, Star Wars, and Disney.

=== Crown Publishing Group ===
Crown Publishing was founded in 1933 as the Outlet Book Company, a remainder house, and is now a publisher of fiction and narrative non-fiction. In 2018, Crown was combined with the main Random House Publishing Group.

- Amphoto Books, publishes photography books
- Broadway Books, founded in 1996 as part of Bantam Doubleday Dell and is now the paperback imprint of Crown
- Clarkson Potter, produces cookbooks, illustrated gift books, and journals
- Crown Archetype, hardcover publisher of pop-culture titles
- Crown Business, publishes business-related content
- Crown Forum, publishes political discourse
- Hogarth Press, partnership between Crown in the US and Windus in the UK
- Image Catholic Books (Doubleday Religion), Waterbrook & Multnomah publish Christian non-fiction and fiction titles
- Pam Krauss Books, founded in 1915 and publishes culinary, food, and lifestyle related titles
- Ten Speed Press, joined Crown in 2009 as a West Coast publisher of nonfiction and gift titles
- Tim Duggan Books, founded in 2014
- Watson-Guptill, publishes illustrated art books as part of Ten Speed Press

=== Knopf Doubleday Publishing Group ===
- Alfred A. Knopf, publisher of hardcover fiction and nonfiction, founded in 1915 by Alfred A. Knopf, and Blanche Knopf. Titles under Alfred A. Knopf have won 58 Pulitzers as well as Nobel and National Book Awards.
- Doubleday, publisher of commercial, literary, and serious nonfiction founded in 1897
- Pantheon, founded in 1942 by Kurt Wolff
- Schocken, publisher of Judaica, became a part of Random House in 1945
- Vintage Books, trade paperback publisher founded by Alfred A. Knopf in 1954
- Anchor Books, publisher of history, science, women's studies, sociology and fiction
- Vintage Español, Spanish-language publisher in the United States, founded in 1994 by Alfred A. Knopf
- Black Lizard, also known as Vintage Crime, publisher of crime fiction, acquired by Random House in 1990
- Nan A. Talese, literary imprint formed in 1990 to house authors published by editor Nan A. Talese
- Everyman's Library, a series of reprinted classic literature currently published in hardback

=== Penguin Publishing Group ===
- Avery, publisher of nonfiction and lifestyle books founded in 1974
- Berkley Publishing Group/New American Library, contain several imprints including Jove, Signet, Ace, Roc, Sensation, and Caliber
- DAW, publisher of science fiction and fantasy
- Dutton, small boutique fiction and non-fiction publisher of about 40 books per year
- Putnam, publisher founded in 1838
- Pamela Dorman Books/Viking, established in 2010 as a boutique publisher of VP Pamela Dorman
- Penguin, established in 1935 in the UK as a publisher of mass market paperbacks; houses Penguin Books, Penguin Classics, and most recently Penguin Press
- Perigee, originally the trade paperback imprint for G.P. Putnam's Sons; publishes prescriptive non-fiction, self-help and how-to books
- Plume, trade paperback imprint with a focus on multi-cultural and LGBT publishing
- Portfolio, founded in 2001 as a business imprint
- Riverhead, publisher of literary fiction and non-fiction founded in 1994
- Sentinel, founded in 2003 as a conservative imprint
- TarcherPerigee, publisher of mind, body, and spiritualism titles
- Viking Press, founded in 1925 and publishes both fiction and non-fiction titles

=== Penguin Young Readers Group ===
Penguin Young Readers Group is a division devoted to books for young readers and young adults.

- Dial Books for Young Readers, publishes about 70 hardcover children's books per year
- Firebird, publishes young adult science fiction and fantasy
- Frederick Warne, publisher founded in 1865 that develops brands based on classic children's literature such as Peter Rabbit
- G.P. Putnam's Sons Books for Young Readers, publisher of picture books
- Grosset & Dunlap, publisher of paperback series, leveled readers, nonfiction, brands, and licenses for ages 0–12
- Kathy Dawson Books, launched in 2014 by publisher Kathy Dawson to publish hardcover middle-grade and YA fiction
- Ladybird Books, publishes books for toddlers
- Nancy Paulsen Books, launched in 2011 by publisher Nancy Paulsen to publish picture books
- Philomel Books
- Price Stern Sloan (PSS!), founded to publish the Mad Libs books in the 1960s, expanded to publish additional children's, novelty, and humor titles
- Puffin Books, publishes books for young readers in various formats
- Razorbill, publishes middle grade and young adult books
- Speak, launched in 2002 to publish classic and new young adult fiction
- Viking, publishes books for young readers

=== Random House Publishing Group ===
- Ballantine Books, founded in 1952 to publish fiction and nonfiction hardcover and paperback titles
- Bantam Books, originally a publisher of mass-market reprints; currently publishes fiction and nonfiction in all formats
- Boom! Studios, founded in 2005 and acquired in 2024 as a publisher of comic books and graphic novels
- Convergent, publishes in the categories of spiritual practice, personal growth, self-help, relationships, memoir, social commentary, and lifestyle.
- Delacorte Press, founded in 1921 as a publisher of pulp magazines, detective stories, and movie articles, has expanded to publish original fiction in all formats
- Del Rey Books, branch of Ballantine Books that focuses on science fiction and fantasy titles
- The Dial Press, literary publisher
- Inklore, founded in 2023 to publish manga, manhwa, manhua, webcomics adaptations, and light novels
- Harmony Books publishes in the categories of wellness, psychology, science, self-help, spirituality, relationships, personal growth and memoir.
- Modern Library, publisher of American and international classics founded by Boni & Liveright
- Random House, originally founded in 1927 by Bennett Cerf and Donald Klopfer, and publishes fiction
- Rodale Books (formerly Rodale, Inc.) publishes in the categories of health and fitness, self-improvement, career advancements, relationships, parenting, spirituality, cooking, and lifestyle.
- Heyne Publishing, a German fiction Publisher for mass-market
- Spiegel & Grau
- Sugar23 Books, fiction and non-fiction
- Alibi, Flirt, Hydra, and Loveswept, publish e-originals in genre fiction
- One World, founded in 1991 with a focus on multicultural fiction and nonfiction, relaunched in 2016

=== Random House Children's Books ===
- Alfred A. Knopf Books for Young Readers, publisher of board books, picture books, novels and non-fiction
- Bluefire, fantasy imprint for middle grade and young adult readers
- Crown Books for Young Readers
- Dragonfly, publishes paperback picture books
- Ember, publishes young adult and middle grade trade paperbacks, such as titles by Judy Blume and Dana Reinhardt
- Frederick Warne & Co., publishes children's books, such as titles by Beatrix Potter
- Golden Books, picture book, novelty, and activity book publisher launched in 1900
- Laurel-Leaf, publishes young adult literature in a mass-market format
- Little Tiger Press, British publisher
- Make Me A World, imprint dedicated to exploring the vast possibilities of contemporary childhood, directed by Christopher Myers
- The Princeton Review, publishes print and digital test prep materials
- Random House Books for Young Readers, publisher of Dr. Seuss, Babar, Magic Tree House series, Junie B. Jones, and Step into Reading
- Random House Graphic, launched in 2018, publishes graphic novels
- Schwartz and Wade, launched in 2005 and directed by Anne Schwartz and Lee Wade
- Sylvan Learning, publishes workbooks and study aids.
- Yearling Books, publishes middle grade paperbacks
- Wendy Lamb Books, publisher of middle-grade and young adult fiction launched in 2002

=== Sourcebooks ===
- Sourcebooks
- Sourcebooks Landmark
- Sourcebooks Casablanca
- Cumberland House
- Simple Truths
- Sourcebooks Fire
- Sourcebooks Kids
  - Sourcebooks Wonderland
  - Sourcebooks Jabberwocky
  - Sourcebooks Young Readers
  - Sourcebooks eXplore
- Poisoned Pen Press
- Bloom Books
- Callisto Media
  - Rockridge Press

=== Penguin Random House Digital Publishing Group ===
- Random House Puzzles & Games
- Sasquatch Books
- Audiobooks
  - Books on Tape
  - Listening Library
  - Penguin Audio
  - Random House Audio
  - Playaway

=== Penguin Random House International ===
- Companhia das Letras (70% Brazil)
  - Alfaguara
  - Objetiva
  - Suma de Letras
  - Zahar
- Penguin Random House Australia
- Penguin Random House Group (UK)
- Penguin Random House Grupo Editorial (Spain/Portugal/Latin America)
  - Alfaguara
  - Ediciones B
  - Editorial Bruguera
  - Plaza & Janés
  - Roca Editorial
  - Santillana Ediciones Generales
- Penguin Random House India
  - Duckbill Books
  - Penguin Enterprise, vanity publishing division focusing on bespoke publishing services for corporations and individuals
- Penguin Random House New Zealand
- Penguin Random House Canada
- Penguin Random House South Africa
  - Struik
- Transworld Ireland
- Verlagsgruppe Penguin Random House (Germany)

=== Penguin Random House Publisher Services ===
Handling distribution and marketing for Shambhala Publications, Disney Publishing Worldwide (including National Geographic Books), Wizards of the Coast, Kodansha USA (including Vertical Inc.), New York Review Books, Titan Books, Other Press, North Atlantic Books, Blue Star Press, DC Comics, Seven Seas Entertainment, and Dark Horse Comics among others.

It also handles direct market distribution for Marvel Comics starting October 1, 2021, direct market distribution for IDW Publishing starting June 1, 2022, and direct market distribution for Dark Horse Comics starting June 1, 2023.

=== Ebury Publishing ===
- BBC Books
- Ebury Press
- Rider
- Time Out
- Virgin Books
- Vermilion

== Subsidiaries ==
=== Book Country ===
Book Country was a subsidiary online writing and publishing community. Book Country was launched in April 2011 with a focus on romance, mystery, science fiction, fantasy. On July 29, 2013, Book Country relaunched with online writing workshops in more than 60 literary categories, including literary fiction, memoir, and women's fiction. As of September 2013, the site had more than 10,000 members. As of May 2025, new members cannot register an account, and it appears that previously registered members can only access limited features.
