= Wayne Bell (disambiguation) =

Wayne Bell is a bulletin board pioneer

Wayne Bell may also refer to:

- Wayne Bell (musician), percussionist and contributor to film music, performer on Drive
- Wayne Bell (rally driver), Australian rally driver in 1978 World Rally Championship season
- Wayne Bell, American publisher at Really Big Coloring Books in St. Louis, Missouri
