= Moorea Seal =

Author and entrepreneur

Moorea Seal is an author and founder of her eponymous brand.

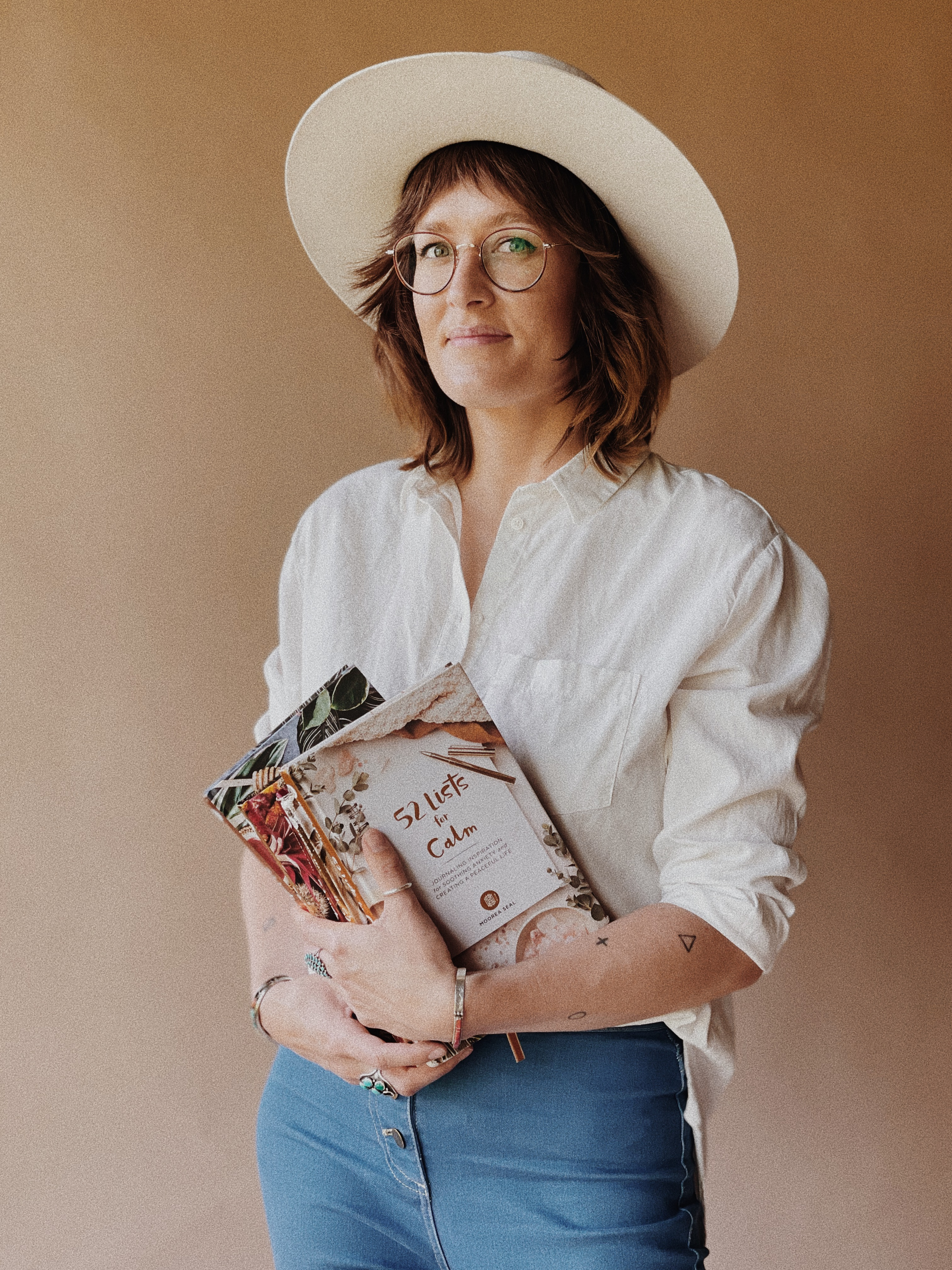
Moorea Seal; Author, Designer, Influencer

== Life and career ==
Seal grew up in England and moved to Nevada City, California when she was eight years old. She graduated from Seattle Pacific University in 2009 with a degree in Illustration and was awarded GOLD Alumna of the Year in 2017. Seal was an early user of Pinterest and has been featured as one of their business success stories. Seal began her self made career by blogging in 2009. Her first small business, a handmade jewelry line, was sustained from 2010 to 2013. Her online retail store, featuring her own work and product from over 40 designers, opened in July 2013, with a physical location opening in May 2014. She subsequently signed a two-book deal with Sasquatch Books. Her journal The 52 Lists Project went viral and between 2015 and 2021, Seal has published 12 books, journals and paper goods with over 1.2 million copies sold. The Moorea Seal company donates 7% of their proceeds to various charities.

== Bibliography ==
- The 52 Lists Projects: A Year of Weekly Journaling Inspiration. 2015. Sasquatch Books. ISBN 9781632170347
- 52 Lists for Happiness: Weekly Journaling Inspiration for Positivity, Balance, and Joy. 2016. Sasquatch Books. ISBN 9781632170965
- Make Yourself at Home: Design Your Space to Discover Your True Self. 2017. Sasquatch Books. ISBN 9781632170354
- 52 Lists for Togetherness: Journaling Inspiration to Deepen Connections with Your Loved Ones. 2018. Sasquatch Books. ISBN 9781632172198
- 52 Lists "My Weekly List" Desk Pad. 2018. Sasquatch Books. ISBN 9781632172327
- 52 Lists "To Do List" Notepad. 2018. Sasquatch Books. ISBN 9781632172334
- 52 Lists Postcards: For Connecting with Loved Ones Near and Far. 2018. Sasquatch Books. ISBN 9781632172310
- 52 Lists Planner: Includes Prompts for Well-Being, Reflection, Personal Growth, and Daily Gratitude. Coral Edition. 2019. Sasquatch Books. ISBN 9781632172341
- 52 Lists for Calm: Journaling Inspiration for Soothing Anxiety and Creating a Peaceful Life. 2019. Sasquatch Books. ISBN 9781632172853
- 52 Lists for Bravery: Journaling Inspiration for Courage, Resilience, and Inner Strength. 2020. Sasquatch Books. ISBN 9781632173317
- 52 Lists Planner: Includes Prompts for Well-Being, Reflection, Personal Growth, and Daily Gratitude. Black Floral Edition. 2020. Sasquatch Books. ISBN 9781632173485
- My 52 Lists Project: Journaling Inspiration for Kids!. 2021. Sasquatch Books. ISBN 9781632173942
- Every Little Thing You Do is Magic: A 78-Card Deck and Guidebook. 2024. Clarkson Potter. ISBN 978-0593580295
- Every Little Thing You Do is Magic: An Interactive Guide to Tarot, Ritual, and Personal Growth: A Tarot Workbook. 2024. Clarkson Potter. ISBN 978-0593580301
