= Bobbie Goods =

Coloring book series by Abbie Goveia

- Author: Abbie Goveia
- Language: English
- Genre: Coloring book
- Published: 2021-present
- No. of books: 4

Bobbie Goods is a series of illustrated coloring books from the United States created by American designer and illustrator Abbie Goveia.

Currently, there are four published editions, each with a different theme, as well as a drawing guide based on the artist's style.

In Portuguese, the official editions are published by HarperCollins Brasil.

== Content ==
The four traditional editions consist of illustrated books with black and white images of anthropomorphized animals in everyday situations. The book has a visual constant style and a recurring group of characters.

== Characters ==
- Bobbie
- Momo
- Kickflip
- Beanbag
- Dr. Parmesan
- Pierre
- Apple
- Opal

== Bobbie Goods in Brazil ==
Within seven months, the series sold over 2.5 million copies nationwide. In August 2025, the four main editions held the top four positions on Nielsen-PublishNews’ bestseller list, with a combined total of 77,540 copies sold during that period.
