= Jenna McCarthy =

American author

- Born: Jenna McCarthy; Golden's Bridge, New York
- Occupation: Writer
- Writing career
- Notable works: Everything's relative; If it was easy, they'd call the whole damn thing a honeymoon; Lola's rules for friendship

Jenna McCarthy is an American author. She has written comedic books for children and adults. Her TEDx Talk "What You Don't Know About Marriage" got over 4 million views on TED.

== Books ==
- McCarthy, Jenna (2008). The Parent Trip: From High Heels and Parties to Highchairs and Potties. Santa Barbara, CA: Bella Luna Press. ISBN 978-0-9799135-6-3.
- McCarthy, Jenna (2009). Cheers to the New Mom!/Cheers to the New Dad! Tips and Tricks to Help You Ace the First Months of Parenthood. Sasquatch Books. ISBN 978-1-57061-558-0.
- McCarthy, Jenna (2010). Big Rigs for Moms: A Crash Course in Sons for New Mothers. Seattle: Sasquatch Books. ISBN 978-1-57061-622-8.
- McCarthy, Jenna (2010). Tea Parties for Dads: A Crash Course in Daughters for New Fathers. Sasquatch Books. ISBN 978-1-57061-623-5.
- McCarthy, Jenna (2011). If It Was Easy, They'd Call the Whole Damn Thing a Honeymoon: Living with and Loving the TV-Addicted, Sex-Obsessed, Not-So-Handy Man You Married. East Rutherford: Penguin. ISBN 978-1-101-54500-3.
- Evans, Carolyn; McCarthy, Jenna (2014). Maggie Malone and the Mostly Magical Boots. Naperville: Sourcebooks, Inc. ISBN 978-1-4022-9308-5.
- McCarthy, Jenna (2014). I've Still Got It...I Just Can't Remember Where I Put It: Awkwardly True Tales from the Far Side of Forty. East Rutherford: Penguin. ISBN 978-0-698-14586-3.
- McCarthy, Jenna (2015). Pretty Much Screwed. East Rutherford: Penguin. ISBN 978-0-425-28068-3.
- McCarthy, Jenna (2016). Lola Knows a Lot. Balzer + Bray. ISBN 978-0-06-225017-9.
- McCarthy, Jenna (2017). Poppy Louise is Not Afraid of Anything. Random House Books for Young Readers. ISBN 978-0-385-39087-3.
