= Joyce Reynolds =

Joyce Reynolds is the name of:

- Joyce Reynolds (actress) (1924–2019), American film actress
- Joyce Reynolds (classicist) (1918–2022), British classicist and academic
- Joyce K. Reynolds (1952–2015), American computer scientist
