= Neora Shem-Shaul =

Israeli author and open-source advocate (born 1954)

- Born: 1954 (age 71–72); Tamar

Neora Shem-Shaul (a.k.a. Neora Shem; Hebrew: נאורה שם שאול; born in 1954) is an Israeli author, journalist, digital artist, software developer, and internet and open-source advocate since the 1980s. She founded and edited Zombit journal and was among the pioneers in Israel who wrote and taught about Internet culture. Since 2015, she has been involved in pastoral care, works and volunteers as a Death doula. She created the theater production created MEDEA_EX. Her book, Digital Affair (1993), is considered the first cyberpunk novel in the Hebrew language. She organized Y2HACK and Y2hack4, Israel's first and second hackers’ conferences. In 2000 Yedioth Ahronoth newspaper named her one of the ten most influential people on the Israeli internet.

== Biography ==
Neora was born to Tamar, a librarian, and Benzion Fuchs, a chemistry professor at Tel Aviv University. She grew up in Haifa, Boston, and Herzliya, and has a younger brother, Eden Fuchs, a peace advocate. During the ‘70s and the ‘80s, she worked as a programmer in software companies. She created and produced digital interactive art and took part in exhibitions. In 1997, she was the consultant and participant of Ascola - Life on Screen, a 13-chapter TV series broadcast on Israeli Educational Television. She created websites for the internet and put online the complete writing of Hanoch Levin, Golda Meir, Uri Avnery, and Zvi Yanai. Neora Shem is married, lives in the Shapira neighborhood of south Tel Aviv and has one daughter.

== Journalist ==
Shem-Shaul was a columnist in several newspapers, including Ha'ir, Haaretz, Globes, Hadashot, Shishi (edited by Adam Baruch), Masa Acher Magazine, Atmosphere Magazine of El Al, Mishkafayim for kids, Eureka: Science and Technology Education Magazine, published by Ramot: Tel Aviv University Press. She wrote about various aspects of the net realm and how it influences our lives. wrote in English in the Microsoft Developers Journal.

1994-1997, she founded and served as the editor-in-chief of Zombit, a monthly youth computer journal on computers, games, and the internet, published by Kulanu Press. Regular contributors included Sivan Rahav-Meir, Koren Shadmi, Edo Amin, Yoav Ben-Dov, Nimrod Kerrett, and Shem-Shaul. The journalists participated in Zombit, an Israeli Educational Television computer show.

== Lectures and conferences about Internet culture ==
She has taught at Tel Aviv University, HaMidrasha – Faculty of the Arts, Shenkar College of Engineering, Design and Art, Open University of Israel, ORT Israel, and Beit Berl.

In 2000 Neora organized Y2HACK, the first Israeli Hackers’ conference, held in Tel Aviv, with 400 people in attendance. Lecturers include John Draper, Andy Müller-Maguhn from Chaos Computer Club, and Kevin Mitnick via Videotelephony. The imminent conference wreaked havoc in the Knesset when MK Anat Maor, chairperson of the Science and Technology Committee, asked Elyakim Rubinstein, the Attorney General, to cancel it by claiming that hacking is a criminal activity. Ultimately, the conference was held as planned. Shem-Shaul also organized Y2hacK4, the second Israeli Hackers’ conference held in Tel Aviv in 2004, and attracted 800 people.

== Literature ==
In 1993 Shem-Shaul wrote the novel Digital Affair (in Hebrew: רומן דיגיטלי), which was published by Hakibutz Hameuchad Publishing House and regarded as the first Hebrew Cyberpunk novel. It's a detective love story in cyberspace between an Israeli woman and a Palestinian man who hasn't got the faintest idea about the chasm between them. The Israeli newspapers featured nine thorough reviews of the novel and author interviews, while Israeli television aired two interviews and three radio interviews. The book was available in soft copy and Floppy disk versions, with the latter containing the text, Tetris (the protagonist’s addiction), and communication software for connecting to the author’s computer. In the novel, the Tetris effect is illustrated. Her story, "The Carriage," was published in the anthology Pages of Grass: Hashish in the World’s Culture, in Xargol Publishing House, edited by Dan Daor.

In 2004, she published The Cathedral and the Bazaar, a collection of essays on open source by Hitorerut Publishing, and wrote the introduction, Open Code as a Worldview. The book contains the translated celebrated article, The Cathedral and the Bazaar, by Eric S. Raymond.

== Theater ==
Shem-Shaul created MEDEA_EX, an Interactive and Immersive theater production premièred at the Acco Festival of Alternative Israeli Theatre. The play was hosted at the Internationale Schillertage in the Mannheim National Theatre, Mannheim. It was an adaptation of the Greek tragedy Medea by Euripides and a transformation of the original story into the Israeli–Palestinian conflict. Additional texts were taken from Seneca, Heiner Müller, Robert Graves, Laurie Anderson, Mahmoud Darwish, The Beatles, and Shem-Shaul. Medea is a Palestinian, played alive by Khawlah Hag-Debsy (directed by Amir Orian), sitting in a wheelchair, whereas Avatar plays Israeli Jason. Medea gives up her life for Jason, and when he betrays her, she sends their two children to perpetrate suicide attacks. Online and on-site audience function as chorus, with real-time choices, using 3D projection, staged at the Acre Amphitheatre made by Nimrod Kerrett. She built interactive exhibits at the museums: Nahum Gutman Museum of Art, Bialik House, and Holon Children's Museum, and Agnon House.

== Arts ==
In 1976, she wrote the song "I Have a Little Brother," performed by Arik Einstein, which includes in the vinyl Children, composed by Shem Tov Levi. In 1982, she edited and rhymed Classitaf, a vinyl featuring classical music for children, which Yosi Gerber and Galia Yishai narrated. In 1994, she created an installation for a computer exhibition at the Kalisher 5 gallery, curated by Horit Peled. The structure was inspired by Meir Wieseltier’s poem and featured a clip of leafing through pages of the book Digital Affair at the end of a dark corridor. When the viewer approached, a page was torn, folded, wrinkled, and fell into the trash.

== Spiritual help in dying people ==
After attending kashouvot school, Neora Shem was certified by The Association for Spiritual Care in Israel. She provides meditation guidance to patients with terminal illnesses. She offers companionship to terminally ill patients and their loved ones, primarily as a volunteer, in hospices like The Cancer Hospice, Sheba Medical Center and The palliative Oncological department, Tel Aviv Sourasky Medical Center, and in Sabar Health, one-on-one organization and private settings.
