= Sandi Doughton =

American science journalist

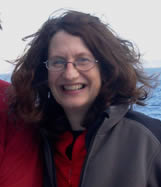
- Doughton on NOAA Bering Sea Ice Expedition in 2006
- Born: Oklahoma, U.S.
- Education: University of New Mexico; Texas A&M University
- Occupation: Journalist
- Writing career
- Genre: Science

Sandi Doughton is an American author and science journalist for The Seattle Times.

== Career ==
Doughton was born in Oklahoma and earned an undergraduate degree from the University of New Mexico with majors in biology and journalism and a minor in chemistry. She chose to enter journalism full time and began her career at the Los Alamos Monitor in Los Alamos, New Mexico. Doughton moved to The News Tribune in Tacoma, Washington, where she was an environment and health reporter before being hired by The Seattle Times.

Her first book, Full-Rip 9.0: The Next Big Earthquake in the Pacific Northwest, was published in 2013 by Sasquatch Books. It describes the earthquake risk posed to the Pacific Northwest by the Cascadia subduction zone, including its discovery in the late 20th century, and predicts its effects on the region's cities and potential aftermath.

Doughton's coverage of the 2014 Oso landslide for The Seattle Times earned her the David Perlman Award for Excellence in Science Journalism from the American Geophysical Union in 2015.

== Works ==
- Doughton, Sandi (2013). Full-Rip 9.0: The Next Big Earthquake in the Pacific Northwest. Sasquatch Books. ISBN 9781570619427. OCLC 895332614.
- Doughton, Sandi (2020). Becoming a Midwife. Simon & Schuster. ISBN 9781982141431. OCLC 1124339803.
