= Joyce K. Reynolds =

American computer scientist (1952–2015)

- Born: March 8, 1952
- Died: December 28, 2015 (aged 63)
- Education: University of Southern California
- Known for: Her work on the Internet
- Scientific career
- Fields: Computer science
- Workplaces: ISI

Joyce Kathleen Reynolds (March 8, 1952 – December 28, 2015) was an American computer scientist who played a significant role in developing protocols underlying the Internet. She authored or co-authored many RFCs, most notably those introducing and specifying the Telnet, FTP, and POP protocols.

== Career ==
Reynolds held bachelor's and master's degrees in social sciences from the University of Southern California.

From 1983 until 1998, she worked with Jon Postel to develop early functions of the Internet Assigned Numbers Authority, such as the global allocation of IP addresses, Autonomous System (AS) number allocation, and management of the root zone of the Domain Name System (DNS). After Postel's death in 1998, Reynolds helped supervise the transition of the IANA functions to the Internet Corporation for Assigned Names and Numbers. She worked with ICANN in this role until 2001, while remaining an employee of ISI.

From 1987 to 2006, she served on the editorial team of the Request for Comments series, co-leading the RFC Editor function at the ISI from 1998 until 2006.

As Area Director of the User Services area, she was a member of the Internet Engineering Steering Group of the IETF from 1990 to March 1998.

== Death ==
Reynolds died due to complications from cancer on December 28, 2015, at the age of 63.

== Recognition ==
In 1992, she is mentioned in RFC 1336 – "Who's Who in the Internet - Biographies of IAB, IESG and IRSG Members," along with a brief biography. With Bob Braden, she received the 2006 Postel Award, in recognition of her services to the Internet. Upon her death, former IETF Chairman Brian Carpenter suggested that "What would Joyce have said?" should be a guiding question for the organization.

In September 2025, Reynolds was inducted posthumously into the Internet Hall of Fame.

== Selected works ==
- Reynolds, J. K., Postel, J. B., Katz, A. R., Finn, G. G., & DeSchon, A. L. (1985). The DARPA experimental multimedia mail system. Computer, 18(10), 82-89.
- Postel, J. B., Finn, G. G., Katz, A. R., & Reynolds, J. K. (1988). An experimental multimedia mail system. ACM Transactions on Information Systems (TOIS), 6(1), 63-81.
- J. Postel; J. Reynolds (February 1988). A Standard for the Transmission of IP Datagrams over IEEE 802 Networks. Network Working Group. doi:10.17487/RFC1042. STD 43. RFC 1042. Internet Standard 43.
- J. Reynolds (May 1990). The Helminthiasis of the Internet. Network Working Group. doi:10.17487/RFC1135. RFC 1135. Informational.
- Reynolds, J. K. (1991). The helminthiasis of the Internet. Computer networks and ISDN systems, 22(5), 347-361.
- A. Marine; J. Reynolds; G. Malkin (March 1994). FYI on Questions and Answers - Answers to Commonly asked "New Internet User" Questions. Network Working Group. doi:10.17487/RFC1594. FYI 4. RFC 1594. Obsolete. pp. 1-44.

== See also ==
- Internet pioneers
- Women in Technology
