= Women in Technology =

Women in Technology may refer to:

- Women in STEM fields, women who work in the fields of Science, Technology, Engineering, and Mathematics
- Women in Technology (album), by White Town
- Women in Technology International, a worldwide organization dedicated to the advancement of women in business and technology
- Women in Tech, a 2016 professional career guide written by Tarah Wheeler
