= Tara Wheeler (cricketer) =

Australian cricketer

Personal information
- Full name: Tara A Wheeler
- Born: 8 June 1999 (age 27)
- Batting: Right-handed
- Bowling: Right-arm leg break
- Role: Batter

Domestic team information
- Years: Team
- 2021/22: Queensland

Career statistics
Competition	WLA
Matches	5
Runs scored	53
Batting average	13.25
100s/50s	0/0
Top score	18
Catches/stumpings	1/–
- Source: CricketArchive, 26 March 2022

Tara A Wheeler (born 8 June 1999) is an Australian cricketer who plays as a right-handed batter. She last played for Queensland in the Women's National Cricket League (WNCL).

== Domestic career ==
Wheeler plays grade cricket for Gold Coast District Cricket Club. She made her debut for Queensland against South Australia in the WNCL on 6 March 2022, although she did not bat as the match was rained off. She went on to play five matches overall in the tournament, with a top score of 18.
