= Blue Star Press =

American book publisher

Blue Star Press, LLC.
- Type: Private
- Founded: 2015
- Founder: Peter Licalzi; Camden Hendricks
- Headquarters: Bend, OR
- Key people: Peter Licalzi (CEO); Camden Hendricks (Founder); Clare Whitehead (COO); Lindsay Wilkes-Edrington (CCO); Brenna Licalzi (CSO); Lindsay White (CMO); Ashley Walsh (President)
- Website: bluestarpress.com

Blue Star Press is an American publishing company that specializes in adult nonfiction, children’s books, games, and gift products. The company publishes titles under two imprints: Blue Star Press and Paige Tate & Co. It is headquartered in Bend, OR.

== History ==
The company, which began as Blue Star Coloring in 2015, was founded by CEO Peter Licalzi and Camden Hendricks. It has published over 200 books since its formation in March 2015, including several New York Times bestsellers and a USA Today Bestseller. In 2019, the company announced a partnership with Penguin Random House Publisher Services. The multi-year deal allows Penguin Random House Publisher Services to sell and distribute all of Blue Star Press' frontlist and backlist book titles. In 2020, 2021, and 2022, the company was named one of the industry's fastest-growing publishers by Publishers Weekly.

== Books and Games ==
Blue Star Press specializes in subjects such as creative how-to, arts & crafts, health & wellness, coloring, witty nonfiction, children's, and gift books. It publishes under two imprints: Blue Star Press and Paige Tate & Co.. It is also the parent company to Sasquatch Books, a book publisher based in the Pacific Northwest. Blue Star Press acquired Sasquatch Books and their children's imprint Little Bigfoot from Penguin Random House in 2024.

Bestselling titles include Our Big Book of Words and Our Little Adventures by Tabitha Paige; Mom's Story and Dad's Story by Korie Herold; Watercolor Workbook by Sarah Simon; and Mocktail Party by Diana Licalzi and Kerry Benson. The company focuses heavily on building brands and series with many of its authors.

The company also publishes games including Millennial Lotería, a modern take on the Mexican bingo game; Tragos, a Latino party card game; and Get Loud, a competitive bilingual guessing game.

In 2023 the Blue Star Press children's book You Stole My Name, authored by Dennis McGregor, was named one of Kirkus Review's best indie books of the year.

In 2023, PubWest also recognized several Blue Star Press titles with Design Awards, including The Artist's Drawing Book (How-to/Crafts, Gold), Watercolor Workbook (How-to/Crafts, Bronze), and You Stole My Name (Children's Picture Book, Bronze). In 2024, Pubwest awarded Sasquatch Books titles Feasts of Good Fortune with bronze in the Cookbook Category and Field Notes From a Fungi Forager with Gold in specialty gifts.

In 2025, The Sound of Seattle: 101 Songs that Shaped a City by Eva Walker and Jacob Uitti was nominated for the 2025 Association for Recorded Sound Collections Awards for Excellence in Historical Recorded Sound Research.

Blue Star Press also produces custom products for brands including Whataburger, Mosh and Canon.

Blue Star Press has been featured on The Today Show, ABC News, The New York Times and USA Today and worked with authors including NBC News Special Anchor Maria Shriver and Olympian Kara Goucher. The company currently works with around 45 independent artists.

== See also ==
- Coloring book
