= Really Big Coloring Books =

American children's book publisher

- Status: Active
- Founded: 1981
- Founder: N. Wayne Bell
- Country of origin: United States
- Headquarters location: St. Louis, Missouri
- Distribution: U.S.A. Canada, Europe
- Nonfiction topics: Coloring books
- Revenue: 10.5M
- No. of employees: 18
- Official website: http://www.ColoringBook.com

Really Big Coloring Books, Inc is an American publisher based in St. Louis, Missouri. The company develops, publishes, and distributes children's coloring and activity books, some in large format. Some of their products have been deemed controversial due to their political content.

== Company overview ==
Really Big Coloring Books was established in 1981 by publisher Nasherrall Wayne Bell. The company publishes books, coloring and activity books, other paper products covering a range of topics, including animals, cultural events and religious themes. Really Big Coloring Books®, Inc. is a vendor with the U.S. Government Publishing Office’s (GPO) Print Procurement Program. The company also produces politically themed coloring books, covering subjects such as Donald J Trump, Barack Obama, the Tea Party Movement, and Occupy Wall Street. The company distributes its coloring books through wholesale and retail outlets, as well as its own websites. The company owns roughly 1600 domain names related to coloring books. Really Big Coloring Books also distributes its coloring books through educational, private branding and a fundraising division. The company states that their fundraising efforts have helped raise millions of dollars for organizations around the world.

== Notable products ==
=== Yes We Did President Barack Obama 2008 ===
The company gained national attention in 2008 by publishing the Yes We Did - President Barack Obama Coloring and Activity Book. This was the first in the Really Big Coloring Books series on cultural events. The book, recommended for children, parents and educators, received both praise and criticism. Bell maintains that the book simply reflects a historic event, the election of the USA's first African American President.

=== The Tea Party Coloring Book for Kids ===
The company again gained national attention in 2010 following their publication of The Tea Party Coloring Book for Kids. The coloring book, recommended for children aged two to five, contained passages reading "When taxes are too high, the high tax takes away jobs and freedom" and "In 1773 we had a Tea Party and this led to freedom from high taxes. Today we are having another Tea Party and this will lead to freedom from high taxes again!" Critics argued that the coloring book was not appropriate for children, and instead was more suitable for politically right-wing adults due to its positive references to the Tea Party. The publisher asserted that the intentions of The Tea Party Coloring Book for Kids are not political.

=== We Shall Never Forget 9/11: The Kids Book of Freedom ===
In 2011 the company published We Shall Never Forget 9/11: The Kid's Book of Freedom. The coloring book was released prior to the ten-year anniversary of the September 11th terrorist attacks and drew criticism from American Muslim groups for its representation of Muslims. The book contained references to "Radical Islamic Muslim Extremists" ten times, and said "some Muslim people believe the attacks were a conspiracy caused by Jews". The coloring book also asserted that the September 11 terrorist attacks "will change the way America deals with and views the Islamic and Muslim people around the world". Despite the controversy, the company claimed it was having trouble meeting demand for their product. In response to the controversy, the company stated that it has donated a portion of the profits from the coloring book to the non-profit organization Bridges for Peace.

=== Being Gay Is Okay ===
The product was published on March 26, 2013, as a coloring and activity book for children, adults and educators on LGBT issues. CBS News reported that the "'Being Gay is Okay' coloring book is like nothing you or your children have ever seen before" and referred to the book as controversial. Child psychologist Deb Pontillo said "You know, I think it's education, and I don't think there's ever a harm to education". Participants in making of the book included both members of the LGBT community and people that previously knew little about the gay community. OUT Magazine reported "Overall, the novel's main message is that being gay is something to be celebrated and there is community, history and resources to be found in LGBTQ culture." Wayne Bell insisted, "The book is about education, diversity and inclusion. Every part of the book is suitable for parents, educators and all children. There is nothing in the book about sex and there is no agenda, it is about reality through honest introduction of issues some people must face".

=== Ted Cruz to the Future Comic Coloring and Activity Book ===
The company produced a coloring and activity book featuring Senator Ted Cruz: U.S. Sen. Ted Cruz to the Future which is intended for "all ages." Cruz did not cooperate in its production. The cover features the senator pointing at a flourishing tea plant whose stalks are stencilled with the "Ten Commandments" and "U.S. Constitution." Stencils on the leaves of the plant include "Gun rights," "Free Enterprise," and "Lower Taxes".

=== Anti ISIS Coloring Book Comic Culture of Evil ===
Really Big Coloring Books released Anti ISIS Coloring Book Comic Culture of Evil, aimed at adults. The coloring book was met with controversy due to its subject matter. The publisher defended the book as depicting real events. The book was banned on Amazon as individuals and groups mounted a protest against the book as being "too realistic".

=== Pope Francis Coloring and Activity Book ===
Really Big Coloring Books Inc. released the Pope Francis Coloring and Activity Book, aimed at all ages. They received a letter in response from the Vatican. A company official stated the book was created with integrity, respect, honesty and courage.

=== President Donald J. Trump and Vice President Michael Pence ===
Really Big Coloring Books released an "unauthorized biography" on Donald Trump and Mike Pence. The cover features photographs of Trump and Pence with information on The White House, the US Capitol and Washington, D.C.

=== President Joe Biden and Vice President Kamala Harris ===
Really Big Coloring Books released an "unauthorized biography" on Joe Biden and Kamala Harris. The cover features photographs of Biden and Harris. One version of the Biden Harris book is printed with hemp paper, a first in US History.

=== 47th US President Donald J Trump Vice President JD Vance elected 2024 ===
Really Big Coloring Books released an "unauthorized biography" on Donald Trump and JD Vance The cover features photographs of President Donald Trump and Vice President JD Vance with information on The White House, the US Capitol and Washington, D.C.
