= Coloring book =

Book containing art to be colored in by the user

Example of a coloring book for children (PDF, printable)

A coloring book (British English: colouring-in book, colouring book, or colouring page) is a type of book containing line art to which a person (usually a child) is intended to add color using crayons, colored pencils, marker pens, paint or other artistic media. Traditional coloring books and coloring pages are printed on paper or card. Some coloring books have perforated edges so their pages can be removed from the books and used as individual sheets. Others may include a story line and so are intended to be left intact. Today, many children's coloring books feature popular characters. They are often used as promotional materials for motion pictures and television. Coloring books may also incorporate other activities such as connect the dots, mazes and other puzzles. Some also incorporate the use of stickers.

== History ==
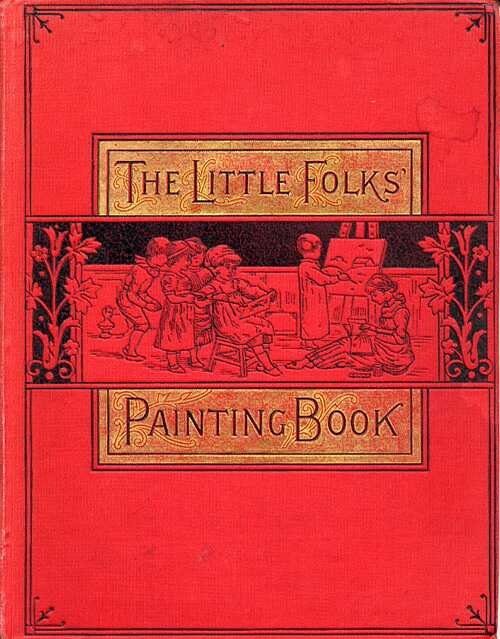
The Little Folks Painting Book, 1879

Paint books and coloring books emerged in Europe and the United States as part of the "democratization of art" process, inspired by a series of lectures by British artist Joshua Reynolds, and the works of Swiss educator Johann Heinrich Pestalozzi and his student Friedrich Fröbel. Many educators concluded that all students, regardless of background, stood to benefit from art education as a means of enhancing their conceptual understanding of the tangible, developing their cognitive abilities, and improving skills that would be useful in finding a profession, as well as for the children's spiritual edification.

Early examples include Der Kleine Zeichner und Maler by publisher Carl August Friese in 1811, Ziehnert, Widar (c. 1835) Neues Bilder-Allerlei für gute Kinder, The Young Artist’s Coloring Guide series and Couleru (1856) Nouveau Cours élémentaire de Coloris et d'Aquarelle. The McLoughlin Brothers popularized the coloring book in the 1880s when they produced The Little Folks' Painting Book, in collaboration with Kate Greenaway. They continued to publish coloring books until the 1920s, when the McLoughlin Brothers became part of the Milton Bradley Company.

Other pioneers in the genre include Louis Prang and Richard F. Outcault. Outcault authored Buster's Paint Book in 1907, featuring his character of Buster Brown, which launched a trend to use coloring books to advertise a wide variety of products, including coffee and pianos. Until the 1930s, books were designed with the intent for them to be painted instead of colored. Even when crayons came into wide use in the 1930s, books were still designed so that they could be painted or colored.

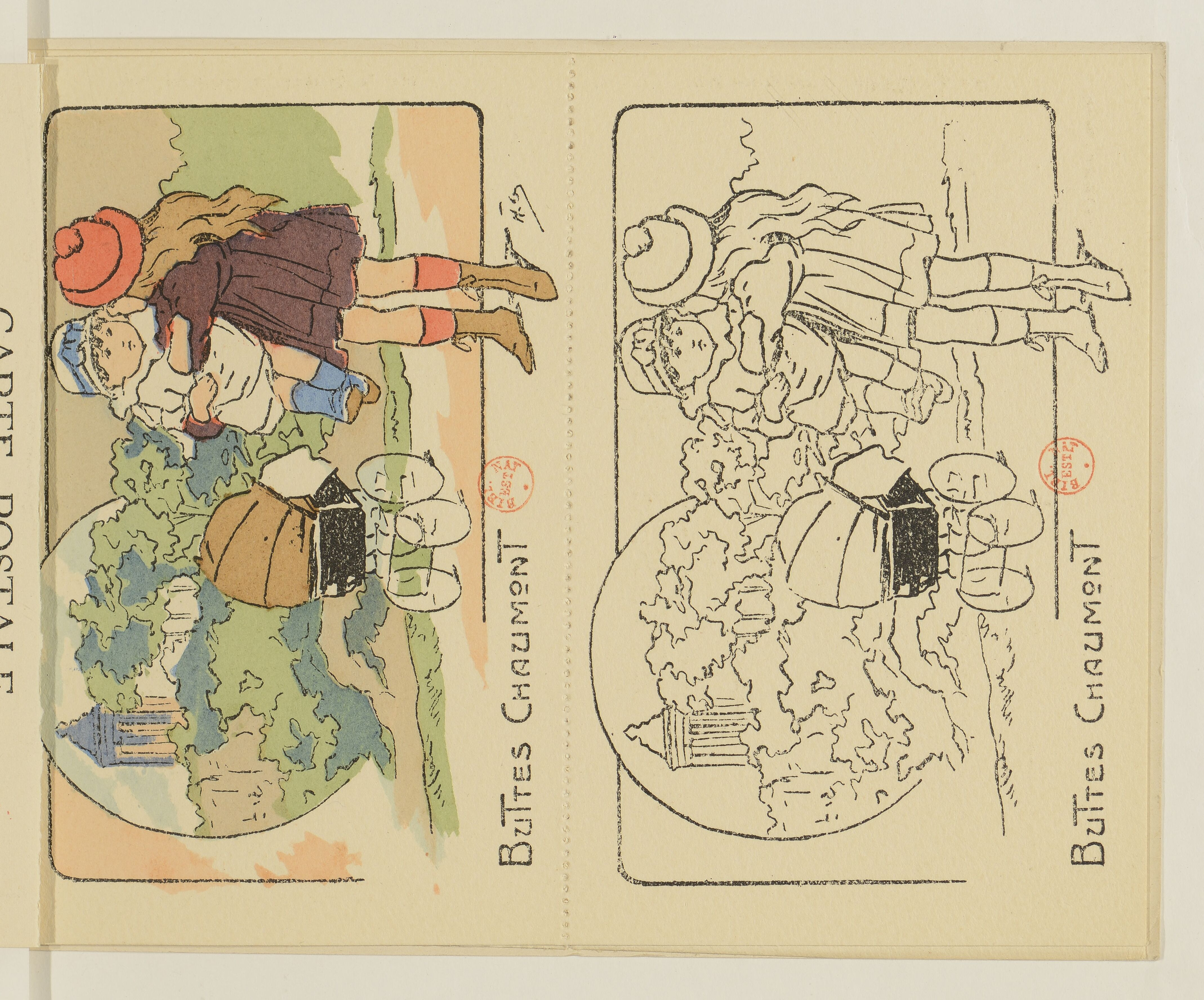
Postcard for coloring, 1920

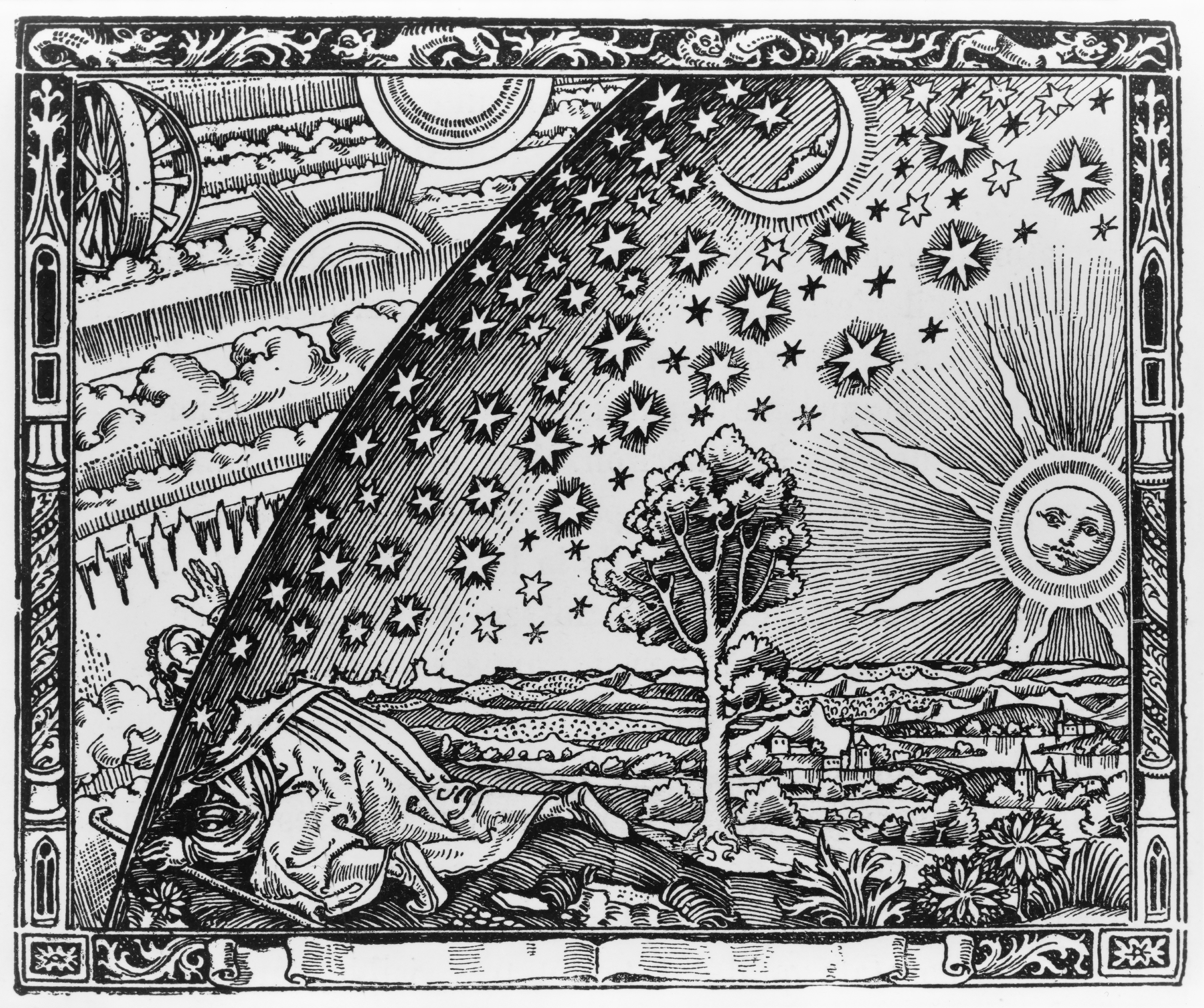
Flammarion engraving, uncolored

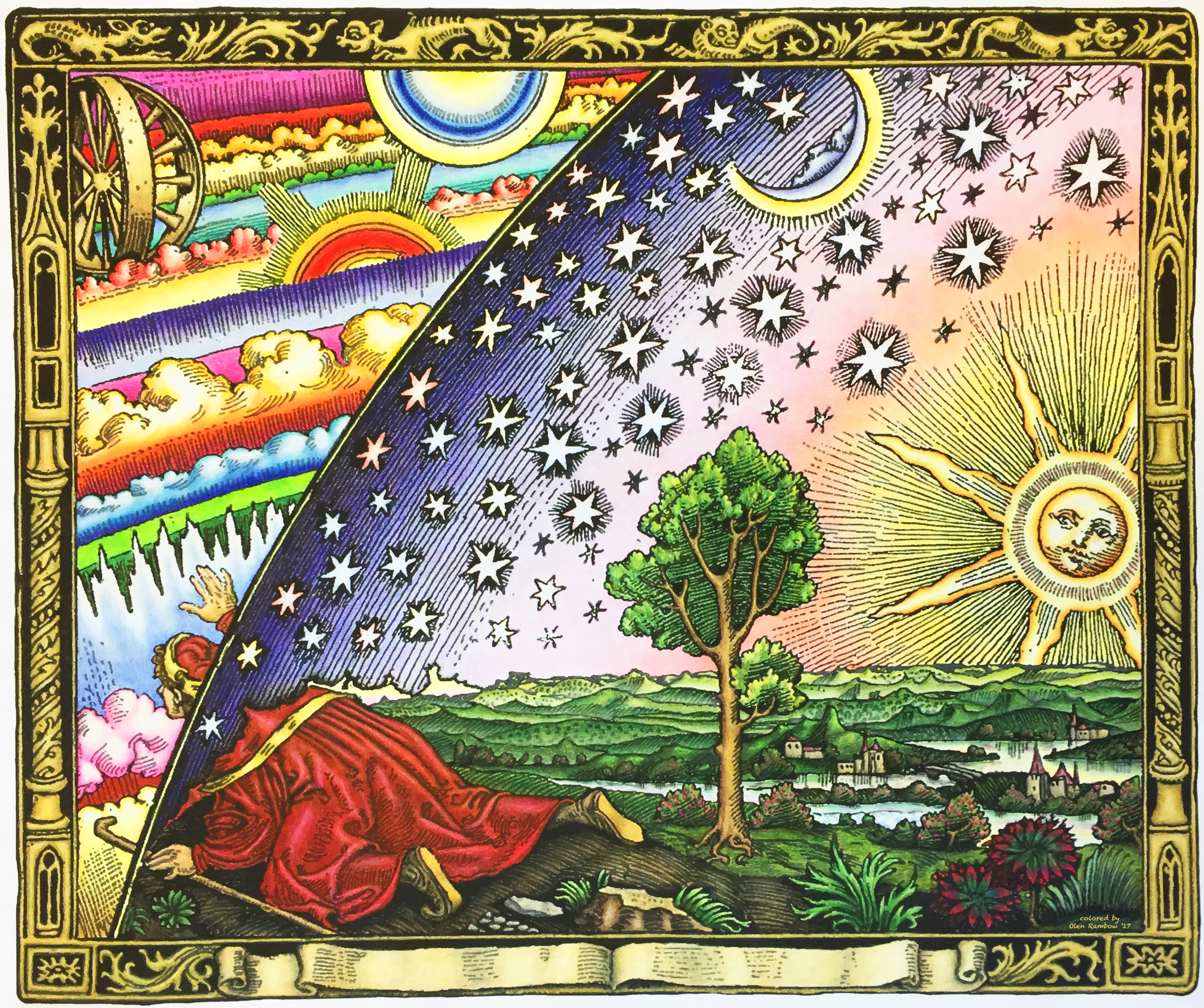
Colored

== Educational uses ==
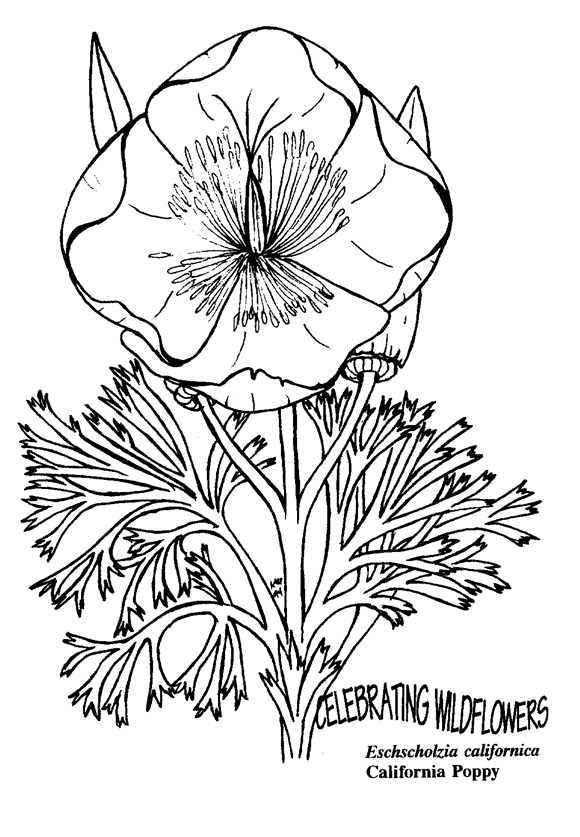
"California Poppy", a page from a wildflower coloring book

Coloring books are widely used in schooling for young children for various reasons. For example, children are often more interested in coloring books rather than using other learning methods; pictures may also be more memorable than simply words. Coloring may also increase creativity in painting, according to some research.

As a predominantly non-verbal medium, coloring books have also seen wide applications in education where a target group does not speak and understand the primary language of instruction or communication. Examples of this include the use of coloring books in Guatemala to teach children about hieroglyphs and Mayan artist patterns, and the production of coloring books to educate the children of farm workers about "the pathway by which agricultural pesticides are transferred from work to home." Coloring books are also said to help to motivate students' understanding of concepts that they would otherwise be uninterested in.

They have been used as teaching aids for developing creativity and knowledge of geometry, such as in Roger Burrows' Altair Designs.

Since the 1980s, several publishers have produced educational coloring books intended for studying graduate-level topics such as anatomy and physiology, where color-coding of many detailed diagrams are used as a learning aid. Examples include The Anatomy Coloring Book and subsequent book series, by Wynn Kapit and Lawrence Elson, published by HarperCollins (1990s) and Benjamin Cummings (2000s). There are some examples of educators using coloring books to better explain complicated topics, like programming.

Some publishers have specialized in coloring books with an explicit educational purpose, both for children and for adults. The books often have extensive text accompanying each image. These publishers include Dover Books, Really Big Coloring Books, Running Press, and Troubador Press.

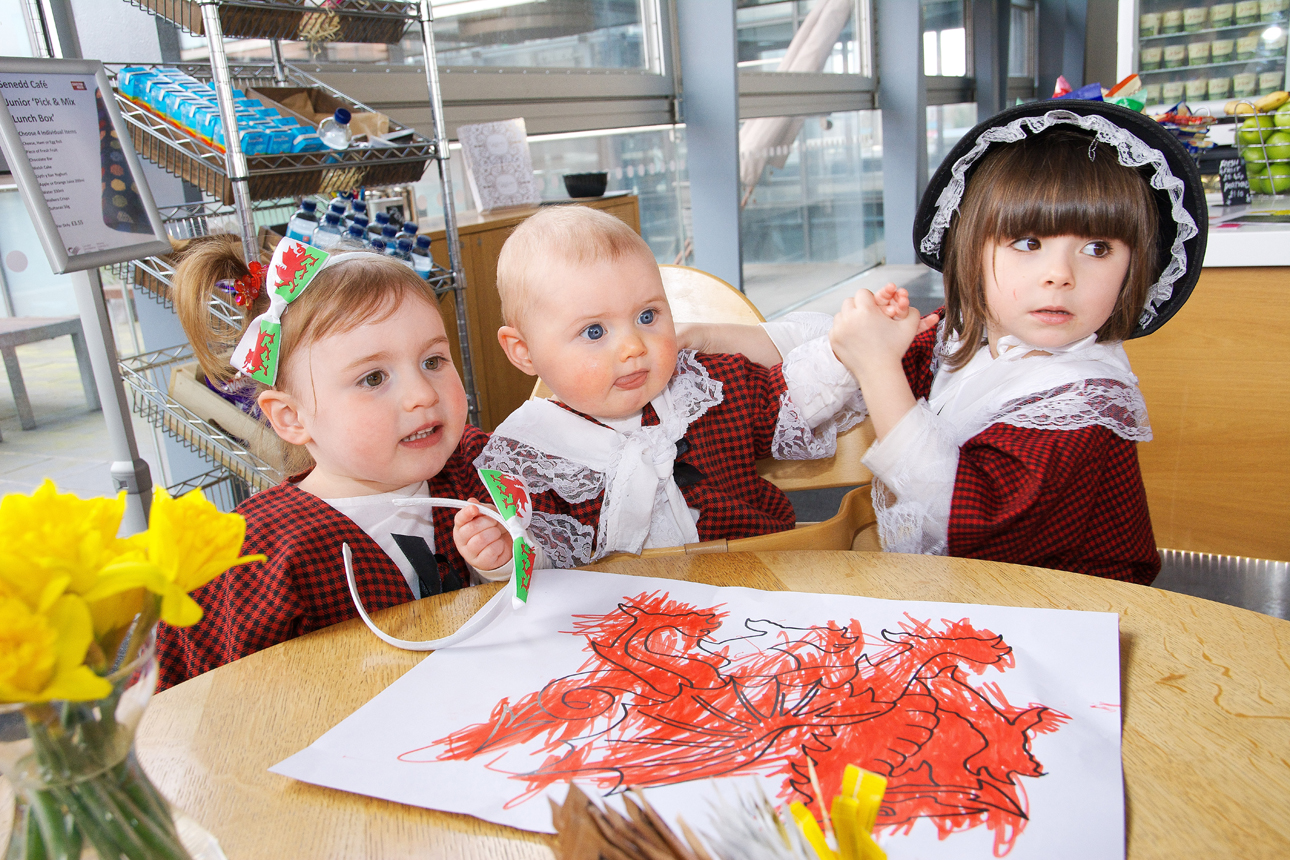
Young children learning to color

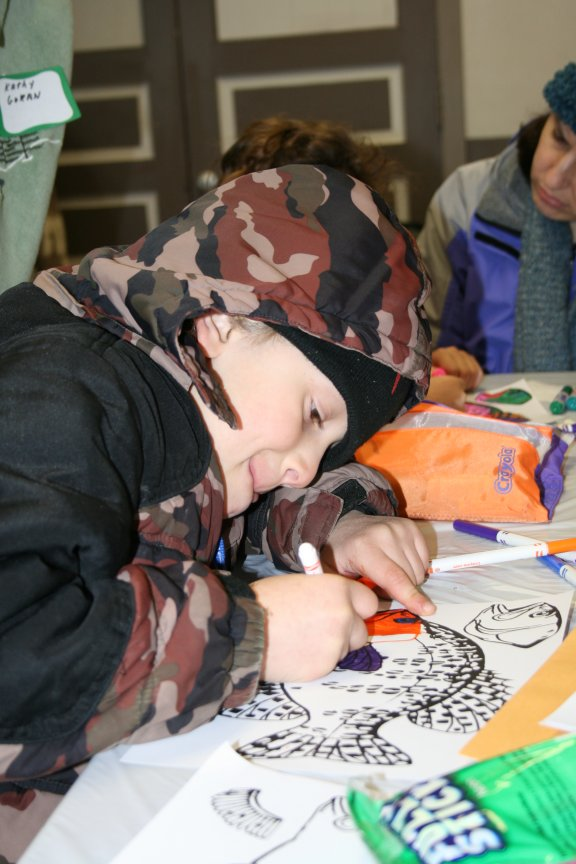
Child coloring a page

Educational coloring book about prehistoric life {PDF, printable)

== Health and therapeutic uses ==
Coloring books have seen wide application in the health professions as educational tools. One nurse, trying to limit the trauma of surgery, described in an academic publication how the use of a coloring book "might help [the child] to understand what was going to happen to him." They are also used in rehabilitation of accident victims to aid recovery of hand–eye coordination, and they are used with autistic children both for entertainment and for their soothing effect. Coloring books have been used to explain complicated medical conditions to children. One of the appeals of adult coloring books is that they help users relax and de-stress.

== Political uses ==
In 1962, cartoonist Mort Drucker teamed with humorist Paul Laikin in creating the John F. Kennedy Coloring Book, a satirical introduction to Kennedy, his family and administration, told from the point of view of his daughter Caroline. The book sold 2,500,000 copies.

In 1968 the Black Panther Coloring Book began circulating in the United States; the book features black men and children killing pigs dressed as police officers. It was argued to have been made not by the Black Panther Party but by the Federal Bureau of Investigation's COINTELPRO program to discredit the organization, a claim which other sources dispute.

The term and concept of the "coloring book" was adopted by the feminist artist Tee Corinne as a tool of female empowerment. Corinne made pencil sketches of female genitalia, which she then inked and printed on card stock. She published a collection of them in 1975 as The Cunt Coloring Book.

No other name seemed really to fit, although the word "cunt" was not one with which I was particularly comfortable. The alliteration, though, was nice. I also liked the idea of combining a street term for genitalia with a coloring book, because both are ways that, as children, we get to know the world.

In August 2011, American publisher Really Big Coloring Books released We Shall Never Forget: The Kids Book of Freedom detailing specific drawings in the accounting of SEAL Team 6 shooting Osama bin Laden in his home. The book was criticized by some for portraying Muslims in a negative manner. The company has also published The Tea Party Coloring Book for Kids, Ted Cruz To The Future (2013) and a book about President Barack Obama's first inauguration (2008).

== Fine art ==
Photographer Jno Cook produced line drawings based on Robert Frank's The Americans, and in 1983 published them in a limited edition as The Robert Frank Coloring Book. In 1994, the National Gallery of Art used the images as party favors for writers working on the catalog for a retrospective of Frank's work.

== Adult coloring books ==
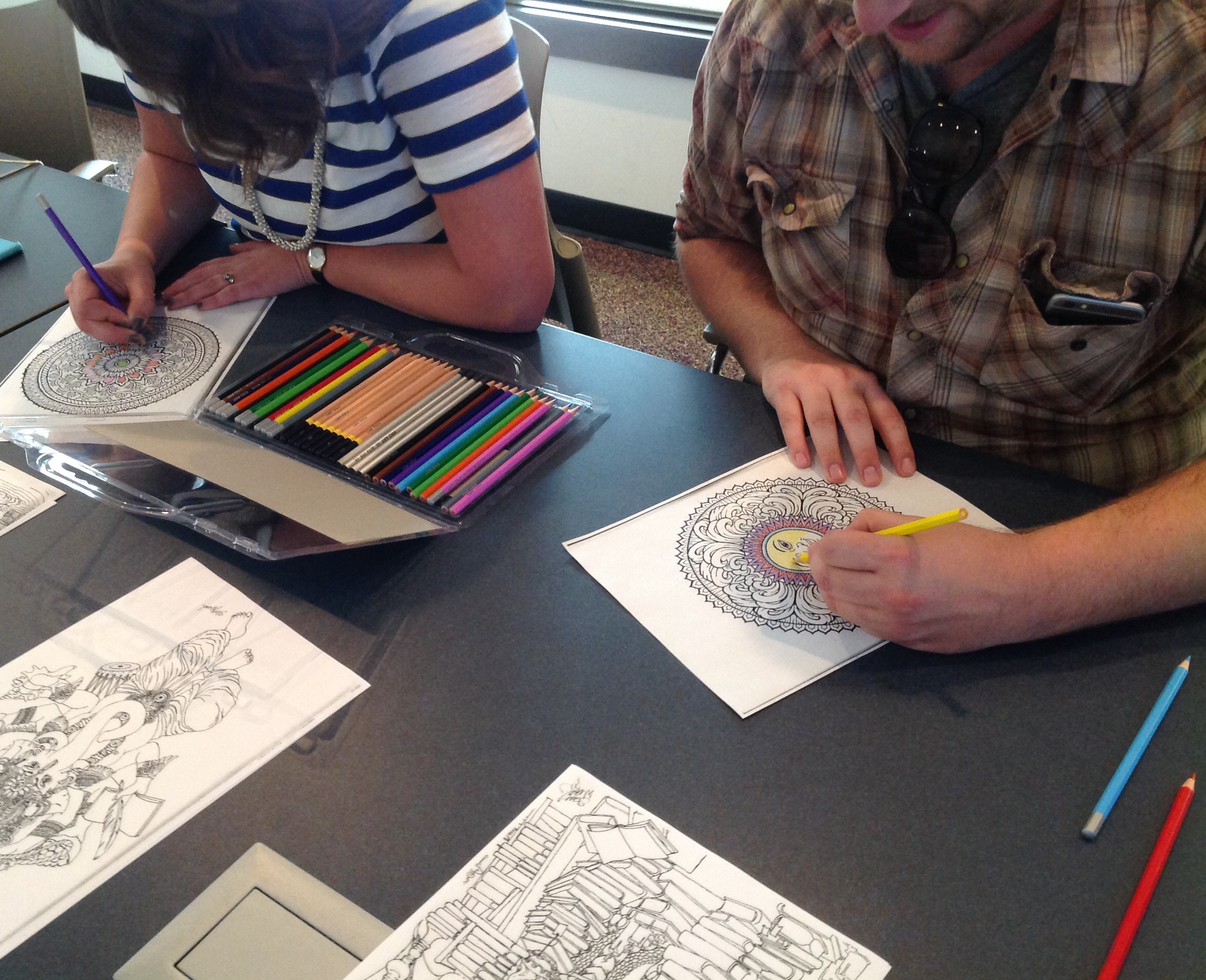
Adults coloring at a library program

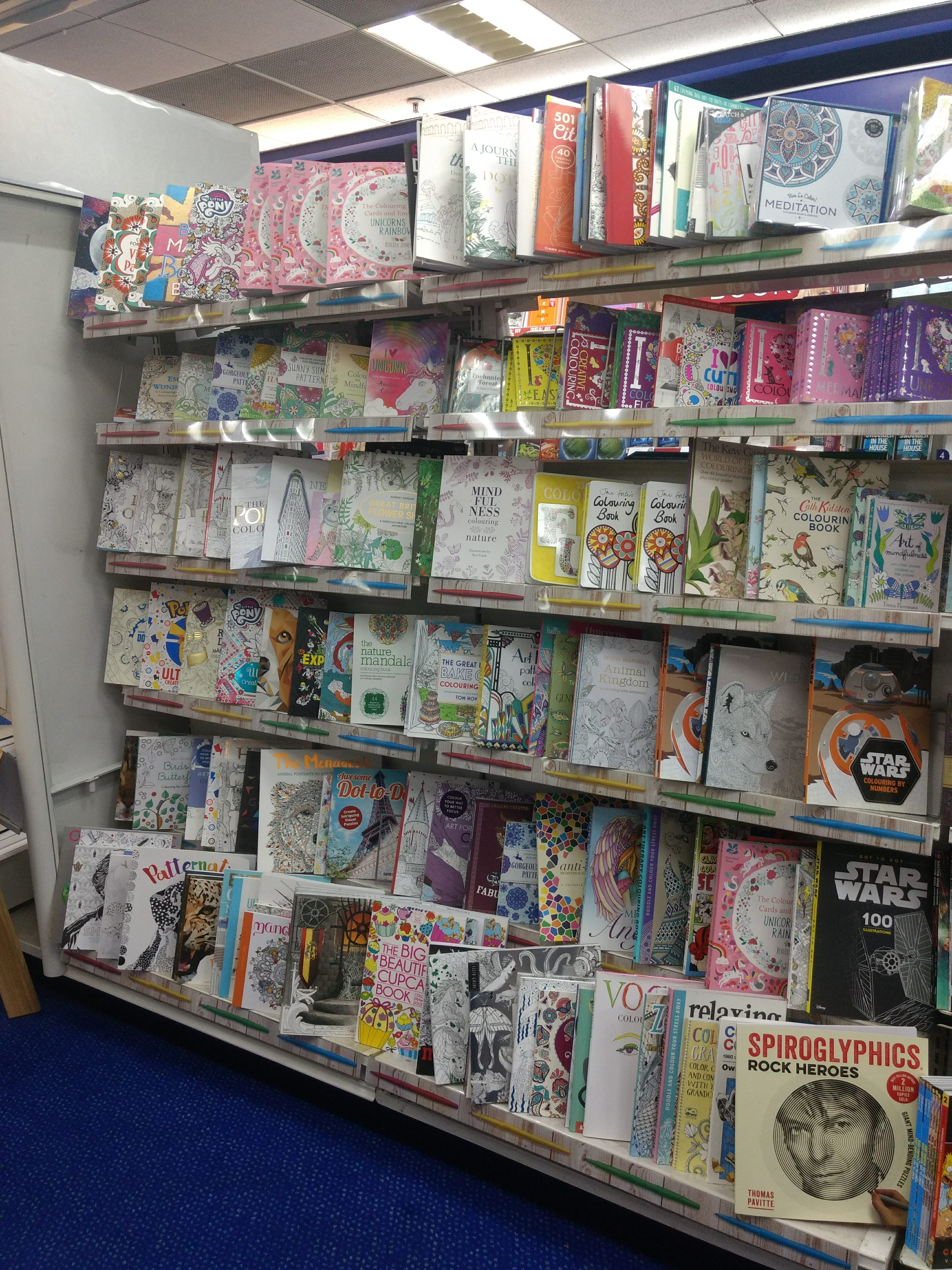
Display of adult coloring books in a shop, 2018

Coloring books are a form of adult therapy that saw a growth in popularity in the 2010s. They reportedly bring people a sense of their childhood, and help with developing fine motor skills and vision, reducing anxiety and creating focus, and relieving stress and anxiety in a manner similar to meditation. Concentrating on coloring may facilitate the replacement of negative thoughts and images with pleasant ones. Coloring books can be used in daily activities. The books are also a way to get away from technology, which some may regard as beneficial to people's health. They can also be used by people who aren't as comfortable with other extremely expressive forms of art.

While coloring books for adults were popular in the early 1960s, those were satirical works rather than the therapeutic works that define the adult coloring book form today. The first commercially successful adult coloring books were published in 2012 and 2013, and began increasing in popularity in 2015. In April of that year, Johanna Basford brought out two coloring books titled Secret Garden and Enchanted Forest, which became the top sellers at Amazon. By November it was reported by Amazon.ca that the books were the most top wished for items with nine of the top ten consisting of such books. Also that month Crayola began offering its own line of adult coloring books. Publishers also began packaging some of their coloring books with pencils and CDs to support the enjoyment of this activity. In 2016, Faber-Castell, a worldwide color pencil supplier, was reported to have trouble keeping up with demand for their products due to the craze, while Blue Star Coloring sold over a million titles in one year. The scale of the trend in the United States began to decrease by the end of 2016. As of 2025, content featuring adult coloring books were part of the "cozy coloring" trend on TikTok.

Adult coloring books are offered digitally, via ebooks, digital apps, and coloring pages that can be colored online or downloaded. Users' digital work-products can be saved and shared. Dominic Bulsuto theorized that the trend of digital purchasing helped the spread of the genre, noting that the relative anonymous nature of the act allowed customers to feel more secure perusing books they would be embarrassed to buy in real life.

=== Criticism ===
Author Susan Jacoby has criticized adult coloring books, along with the popularity among adults of young adult fiction, as "an artifact of a broader cultural shift. And that cultural shift is a bad thing". She believes the Great Recession has contributed to this shift, as adults unable to find employment have moved home to live with their parents. New York City futurist and blogger Dominic Basulto describes adult coloring book fans as "stuck in The Shallows, mindfully coloring books to counter the existential angst of living in a digital society". He goes on to say that "...the endless Internet parade of silly cat photos, infantile comments and adolescent memes has dumbed us down". However, Basulto ultimately sees the trend as a good thing, noting that adults are increasingly buying books they want to buy, rather than books they are supposed to buy.

== Coloring book software ==
Coloring books can also be found digitally in the form of coloring book websites and applications. Coloring book software often has features such as color mixing, flood filling, and paintbrush tools that allow for more accurate and detailed drawings than regular coloring books.

== Notable artists ==
- Johanna Basford
- Ruth Heller
