= Internationale Schillertage =

Theatre festival on Friedrich Schiller

Internationale Schillertage ("International Schiller Days", commonly abbreviated as Schillertage) is a theatre festival taking place every two years in the Mannheim National Theatre in Mannheim, Baden-Württemberg in Germany about the works of Friedrich Schiller. The first Internationale Schillertage took place in 1978. In 2015, about 21,000 visitors came to the Internationale Schillertage.

The first Schiller Days took place in 1978. The artistic director of the Schillertage from 2006 to 2017 was Burkhard C. Kosminski, Intendant Schauspiel at the National Theater of Mannheim. The 2019 Schillertage were under the direction of his successor Christian Holtzhauer. The 20th International Schillertage in 2019 attracted about 25,000 visitors. The events in 2021 had to take place outdoors or mostly online due to restrictions caused by the Corona pandemic. Three world premieres were realized in this context as part of the implementation of new forms of cooperation together with independent cultural institutions of Mannheim.
