= Women in Tech =

2016 professional career guide written by Tarah Wheeler

Women in Tech: Take Your Career to the Next Level with Practical Advice and Inspiring Stories
- First edition
- Author: Tarah Wheeler Van Vlack
- Published: 2016
- Publisher: Sasquatch Books
- Pages: 272
- ISBN: 978-1-63217-066-8 (Hardcover)
- OCLC: 1066056914

Women In Tech: Take Your Career to the Next Level with Practical Advice and Inspiring Stories is a 2016 professional career guide written by Tarah Wheeler and published by Sasquatch Books. The book began as a Kickstarter project, with 772 backers and $32,226 in funding.

The book includes advice for women developing career skills such as salary negotiation, networking, and finding work–life balance, as well as personal stories from female tech professionals.

== Reception and Impact ==
Library Journal called Women in Tech "The essential handbook for women in technology -- engaging, practical, and inspirational."

In the fall of 2016 the University of California, Berkeley taught a class on Wheeler's book and the necessities for overcoming barriers to entry in the technology industry and the requirements for success as a woman trying to enter the field.

Women in Tech has been translated into Korean.
