= Tarah Wheeler =

American cybersecurity executive and diversity activist (born 1979)

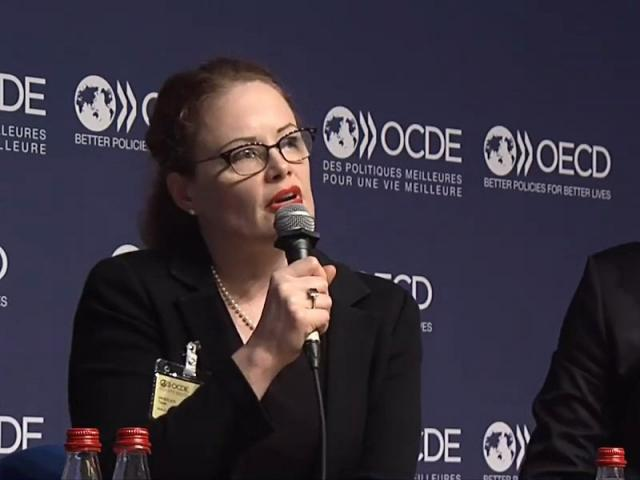
- Born: Tarah Marie Wheeler; February 12, 1979 (age 47); Washington, U.S.
- Education: Carroll College (BA); Portland State University (MS)
- Spouses: Dean Van Vlack (m. 2010–2015) Deviant Ollam (m. 2017)

Tarah Marie Wheeler (born February 12, 1979) is an American technology and cybersecurity author, public speaker, computer security professional, and executive. She is currently CEO of Red Queen Dynamics and Senior Fellow of Global Cyber Policy at the Council on Foreign Relations, and she is the author of Women in Tech.

== Early life and education ==
Wheeler received a Bachelor of Arts degree from Carroll College in 2001 and a Master of Science degree from Portland State University in 2004.

== Career ==
Wheeler was a systems architect at mobile encryption firm Silent Circle.

In 2016, Wheeler was named a Cybersecurity Passcode Influencer by Christian Science Monitor and spoke to the Federal Trade Commission on information security in tech startups.

After a Kickstarter campaign, Wheeler published Women in Tech, a book dedicated to teaching women how to succeed in tech careers. The book was published with several contributors, including Esther Dyson and Brianna Wu, one of the targets of the Gamergate harassment campaign.

Wheeler served as the Website Cybersecurity Czar at Symantec, until her position was eliminated in August 2017.

Wheeler and her husband Deviant Ollam helped cybersecurity researcher Marcus Hutchins with his bail in August 2017 and to house him in Los Angeles during his arraignment period while he was investigated by the FBI on charges related to the Kronos rootkit; Hutchins later pleaded guilty to two of ten charges.

In 2021, Wheeler became a Fulbright Scholar in Cybersecurity at the University of Oxford.

Wheeler was a Cyber Project Fellow at the Belfer Center for Science and International Affairs at the Harvard Kennedy School at Harvard University, and an International Security Fellow for New America (organization).

Wheeler is a Senior Fellow of Global Cyber Policy at the Council on Foreign Relations. She is a member of the advisory board of the Electronic Frontier Foundation.

Wheeler has been cited in national media on issues relating to cybersecurity such as cyberterrorism, malware and data breaches and has written about cyberwar policy. Wheeler testified on Right to Repair issues and legislation before the Washington State Senate Environment, Energy & Technology Committee in January 2020. In January 2024, Wheeler appeared before the Senate Committee on Homeland Security and Governmental Affairs regarding the importance of a Cyber Safety Review Board.

In 2025, Wheeler joined DEF CON Franklin to lead its new initiative in securing water utilities across the United States, transitioning from a volunteer-only model to one using a managed security service provider (MSSP) model.

== Bibliography ==
=== Books ===
- Tarah Wheeler Van Vlack, Women in Tech: Take Your Career to the Next Level with Practical Advice and Inspiring Stories, 2016, Hardback ISBN 978-1-63217-140-5

== Poker ==
Wheeler has competed in the World Series of Poker with $4,722 in lifetime cashes. In Women in Tech, Wheeler notes that interests such as poker can be useful in business, the same way golf can be.
