= Sasquatch Books =

American book publisher

Sasquatch Books LLC
- Parent company: Blue Star Press
- Founded: 1986
- Country of origin: United States
- Headquarters location: Seattle, Washington
- Publication types: Books
- Imprints: Little Bigfoot, Spruce Books
- Official website: sasquatchbooks.com

Sasquatch Books LLC is an American book publishing company based in Seattle, Washington. It was founded in 1986 by David Brewster of the Seattle Weekly and primarily publishes nonfiction books about the western United States and Canada and cover topics such as nature, travel, gardening, entertainment, sports, food and wine. By 2003, it was publishing approximately 30 books per year and employed 18 people. In 2020, it launched a new imprint for young adult nonfiction called Spruce Books.

Sasquatch Books was acquired by Penguin Random House in 2017 and later sold to Blue Star Press, an independent book publisher also based in the Pacific Northwest, in June 2024. The Blue Star Press deal returned Sasquatch Books to being an independent publisher, although its titles will continue to be distributed to retailers through the support of Penguin Random House Publisher Services.

== Titles ==
- Book Lust by Nancy Pearl (2003)
- Gardener's Yoga: 40 Yoga Poses to Help Your Garden Flow by Veronica D'Orazio (2015)
- Full-Rip 9.0: The Next Big Earthquake in the Pacific Northwest by Sandi Doughton
- Women in Tech: Take Your Career to the Next Level with Practical Advice and Inspiring Stories by Tarah Wheeler (2016)

== See also ==
- List of publishers
